

201001–201100 

|-bgcolor=#E9E9E9
| 201001 ||  || — || February 8, 2002 || Socorro || LINEAR || — || align=right | 1.6 km || 
|-id=002 bgcolor=#fefefe
| 201002 ||  || — || February 8, 2002 || Socorro || LINEAR || NYS || align=right | 1.3 km || 
|-id=003 bgcolor=#E9E9E9
| 201003 ||  || — || February 8, 2002 || Socorro || LINEAR || — || align=right | 2.2 km || 
|-id=004 bgcolor=#fefefe
| 201004 ||  || — || February 10, 2002 || Socorro || LINEAR || FLO || align=right | 1.0 km || 
|-id=005 bgcolor=#fefefe
| 201005 ||  || — || February 10, 2002 || Socorro || LINEAR || SUL || align=right | 2.9 km || 
|-id=006 bgcolor=#C2FFFF
| 201006 ||  || — || February 10, 2002 || Socorro || LINEAR || L4 || align=right | 13 km || 
|-id=007 bgcolor=#fefefe
| 201007 ||  || — || February 10, 2002 || Socorro || LINEAR || V || align=right data-sort-value="0.86" | 860 m || 
|-id=008 bgcolor=#fefefe
| 201008 ||  || — || February 10, 2002 || Socorro || LINEAR || MAS || align=right data-sort-value="0.94" | 940 m || 
|-id=009 bgcolor=#fefefe
| 201009 ||  || — || February 10, 2002 || Socorro || LINEAR || NYS || align=right data-sort-value="0.99" | 990 m || 
|-id=010 bgcolor=#fefefe
| 201010 ||  || — || February 10, 2002 || Socorro || LINEAR || NYS || align=right data-sort-value="0.99" | 990 m || 
|-id=011 bgcolor=#fefefe
| 201011 ||  || — || February 10, 2002 || Socorro || LINEAR || — || align=right | 1.3 km || 
|-id=012 bgcolor=#fefefe
| 201012 ||  || — || February 11, 2002 || Socorro || LINEAR || — || align=right | 1.5 km || 
|-id=013 bgcolor=#fefefe
| 201013 ||  || — || February 15, 2002 || Bergisch Gladbach || W. Bickel || MAS || align=right data-sort-value="0.93" | 930 m || 
|-id=014 bgcolor=#fefefe
| 201014 ||  || — || February 3, 2002 || Haleakala || NEAT || V || align=right | 1.2 km || 
|-id=015 bgcolor=#fefefe
| 201015 ||  || — || February 6, 2002 || Palomar || NEAT || — || align=right | 1.4 km || 
|-id=016 bgcolor=#fefefe
| 201016 ||  || — || February 11, 2002 || Socorro || LINEAR || — || align=right | 3.0 km || 
|-id=017 bgcolor=#fefefe
| 201017 ||  || — || February 4, 2002 || Palomar || NEAT || — || align=right | 1.3 km || 
|-id=018 bgcolor=#fefefe
| 201018 ||  || — || February 4, 2002 || Palomar || NEAT || — || align=right | 1.5 km || 
|-id=019 bgcolor=#fefefe
| 201019 Oliverwhite ||  ||  || February 6, 2002 || Kitt Peak || M. W. Buie || MAS || align=right data-sort-value="0.92" | 920 m || 
|-id=020 bgcolor=#fefefe
| 201020 ||  || — || February 6, 2002 || Socorro || LINEAR || — || align=right | 2.2 km || 
|-id=021 bgcolor=#fefefe
| 201021 ||  || — || February 6, 2002 || Socorro || LINEAR || — || align=right | 3.0 km || 
|-id=022 bgcolor=#fefefe
| 201022 ||  || — || February 7, 2002 || Haleakala || NEAT || NYS || align=right data-sort-value="0.95" | 950 m || 
|-id=023 bgcolor=#E9E9E9
| 201023 Karlwhittenburg ||  ||  || February 8, 2002 || Kitt Peak || M. W. Buie || — || align=right | 1.7 km || 
|-id=024 bgcolor=#fefefe
| 201024 ||  || — || February 7, 2002 || Haleakala || NEAT || — || align=right | 1.1 km || 
|-id=025 bgcolor=#fefefe
| 201025 ||  || — || February 8, 2002 || Kitt Peak || Spacewatch || — || align=right | 1.6 km || 
|-id=026 bgcolor=#E9E9E9
| 201026 ||  || — || February 8, 2002 || Kitt Peak || Spacewatch || — || align=right | 1.2 km || 
|-id=027 bgcolor=#fefefe
| 201027 ||  || — || February 9, 2002 || Kitt Peak || Spacewatch || MAS || align=right | 1.2 km || 
|-id=028 bgcolor=#fefefe
| 201028 ||  || — || February 11, 2002 || Socorro || LINEAR || MAS || align=right data-sort-value="0.89" | 890 m || 
|-id=029 bgcolor=#fefefe
| 201029 ||  || — || February 11, 2002 || Socorro || LINEAR || — || align=right | 1.1 km || 
|-id=030 bgcolor=#fefefe
| 201030 ||  || — || February 10, 2002 || Socorro || LINEAR || — || align=right | 1.0 km || 
|-id=031 bgcolor=#fefefe
| 201031 ||  || — || February 7, 2002 || Haleakala || NEAT || — || align=right | 1.2 km || 
|-id=032 bgcolor=#fefefe
| 201032 ||  || — || February 20, 2002 || Kitt Peak || Spacewatch || NYS || align=right | 1.0 km || 
|-id=033 bgcolor=#fefefe
| 201033 ||  || — || February 20, 2002 || Socorro || LINEAR || NYS || align=right data-sort-value="0.80" | 800 m || 
|-id=034 bgcolor=#fefefe
| 201034 ||  || — || February 20, 2002 || Socorro || LINEAR || — || align=right | 1.4 km || 
|-id=035 bgcolor=#fefefe
| 201035 ||  || — || February 16, 2002 || Palomar || NEAT || — || align=right | 1.4 km || 
|-id=036 bgcolor=#fefefe
| 201036 ||  || — || February 16, 2002 || Palomar || NEAT || MAS || align=right data-sort-value="0.90" | 900 m || 
|-id=037 bgcolor=#fefefe
| 201037 ||  || — || February 16, 2002 || Palomar || NEAT || — || align=right | 1.6 km || 
|-id=038 bgcolor=#E9E9E9
| 201038 ||  || — || February 19, 2002 || Kitt Peak || Spacewatch || — || align=right | 1.4 km || 
|-id=039 bgcolor=#C2FFFF
| 201039 ||  || — || March 9, 2002 || Palomar || NEAT || L4 || align=right | 13 km || 
|-id=040 bgcolor=#C2FFFF
| 201040 ||  || — || March 10, 2002 || Haleakala || NEAT || L4 || align=right | 17 km || 
|-id=041 bgcolor=#fefefe
| 201041 ||  || — || March 5, 2002 || Palomar || NEAT || — || align=right | 1.2 km || 
|-id=042 bgcolor=#fefefe
| 201042 ||  || — || March 5, 2002 || Kitt Peak || Spacewatch || NYS || align=right | 1.8 km || 
|-id=043 bgcolor=#fefefe
| 201043 ||  || — || March 5, 2002 || Palomar || NEAT || NYS || align=right data-sort-value="0.95" | 950 m || 
|-id=044 bgcolor=#fefefe
| 201044 ||  || — || March 5, 2002 || Kitt Peak || Spacewatch || — || align=right | 1.9 km || 
|-id=045 bgcolor=#fefefe
| 201045 ||  || — || March 5, 2002 || Kitt Peak || Spacewatch || MAS || align=right | 1.1 km || 
|-id=046 bgcolor=#fefefe
| 201046 ||  || — || March 5, 2002 || Kitt Peak || Spacewatch || MAS || align=right data-sort-value="0.77" | 770 m || 
|-id=047 bgcolor=#fefefe
| 201047 ||  || — || March 10, 2002 || Anderson Mesa || LONEOS || MAS || align=right data-sort-value="0.94" | 940 m || 
|-id=048 bgcolor=#fefefe
| 201048 ||  || — || March 11, 2002 || Palomar || NEAT || V || align=right | 1.0 km || 
|-id=049 bgcolor=#E9E9E9
| 201049 ||  || — || March 11, 2002 || Palomar || NEAT || — || align=right | 1.9 km || 
|-id=050 bgcolor=#fefefe
| 201050 ||  || — || March 11, 2002 || Palomar || NEAT || — || align=right | 2.3 km || 
|-id=051 bgcolor=#fefefe
| 201051 ||  || — || March 11, 2002 || Palomar || NEAT || — || align=right | 1.4 km || 
|-id=052 bgcolor=#fefefe
| 201052 ||  || — || March 9, 2002 || Socorro || LINEAR || — || align=right | 1.5 km || 
|-id=053 bgcolor=#fefefe
| 201053 ||  || — || March 12, 2002 || Socorro || LINEAR || — || align=right | 1.3 km || 
|-id=054 bgcolor=#E9E9E9
| 201054 ||  || — || March 12, 2002 || Socorro || LINEAR || MAR || align=right | 2.3 km || 
|-id=055 bgcolor=#E9E9E9
| 201055 ||  || — || March 13, 2002 || Socorro || LINEAR || — || align=right | 1.6 km || 
|-id=056 bgcolor=#fefefe
| 201056 ||  || — || March 13, 2002 || Socorro || LINEAR || NYS || align=right | 1.1 km || 
|-id=057 bgcolor=#fefefe
| 201057 ||  || — || March 13, 2002 || Socorro || LINEAR || NYS || align=right data-sort-value="0.94" | 940 m || 
|-id=058 bgcolor=#fefefe
| 201058 ||  || — || March 13, 2002 || Socorro || LINEAR || NYS || align=right data-sort-value="0.99" | 990 m || 
|-id=059 bgcolor=#fefefe
| 201059 ||  || — || March 13, 2002 || Socorro || LINEAR || — || align=right | 1.1 km || 
|-id=060 bgcolor=#fefefe
| 201060 ||  || — || March 9, 2002 || Socorro || LINEAR || — || align=right | 1.3 km || 
|-id=061 bgcolor=#fefefe
| 201061 ||  || — || March 9, 2002 || Socorro || LINEAR || NYS || align=right | 1.1 km || 
|-id=062 bgcolor=#fefefe
| 201062 ||  || — || March 12, 2002 || Socorro || LINEAR || — || align=right | 1.1 km || 
|-id=063 bgcolor=#fefefe
| 201063 ||  || — || March 12, 2002 || Socorro || LINEAR || — || align=right | 1.1 km || 
|-id=064 bgcolor=#E9E9E9
| 201064 ||  || — || March 13, 2002 || Socorro || LINEAR || — || align=right | 3.7 km || 
|-id=065 bgcolor=#fefefe
| 201065 ||  || — || March 4, 2002 || Anderson Mesa || LONEOS || — || align=right | 1.3 km || 
|-id=066 bgcolor=#fefefe
| 201066 ||  || — || March 9, 2002 || Anderson Mesa || LONEOS || V || align=right | 1.2 km || 
|-id=067 bgcolor=#fefefe
| 201067 ||  || — || March 9, 2002 || Kitt Peak || Spacewatch || NYS || align=right | 1.1 km || 
|-id=068 bgcolor=#fefefe
| 201068 ||  || — || March 9, 2002 || Catalina || CSS || ERI || align=right | 2.4 km || 
|-id=069 bgcolor=#fefefe
| 201069 ||  || — || March 10, 2002 || Kitt Peak || Spacewatch || MAS || align=right | 1.3 km || 
|-id=070 bgcolor=#E9E9E9
| 201070 ||  || — || March 11, 2002 || Kitt Peak || Spacewatch || — || align=right | 1.8 km || 
|-id=071 bgcolor=#E9E9E9
| 201071 ||  || — || March 12, 2002 || Palomar || NEAT || — || align=right | 1.4 km || 
|-id=072 bgcolor=#E9E9E9
| 201072 ||  || — || March 13, 2002 || Socorro || LINEAR || EUN || align=right | 1.8 km || 
|-id=073 bgcolor=#E9E9E9
| 201073 ||  || — || March 12, 2002 || Apache Point || SDSS || — || align=right | 2.2 km || 
|-id=074 bgcolor=#E9E9E9
| 201074 || 2002 FZ || — || March 18, 2002 || Desert Eagle || W. K. Y. Yeung || — || align=right | 3.8 km || 
|-id=075 bgcolor=#fefefe
| 201075 ||  || — || March 19, 2002 || Desert Eagle || W. K. Y. Yeung || NYS || align=right | 1.1 km || 
|-id=076 bgcolor=#fefefe
| 201076 ||  || — || March 16, 2002 || Socorro || LINEAR || MAS || align=right data-sort-value="0.93" | 930 m || 
|-id=077 bgcolor=#fefefe
| 201077 ||  || — || March 16, 2002 || Socorro || LINEAR || — || align=right | 1.7 km || 
|-id=078 bgcolor=#E9E9E9
| 201078 ||  || — || March 19, 2002 || Anderson Mesa || LONEOS || — || align=right | 1.3 km || 
|-id=079 bgcolor=#E9E9E9
| 201079 ||  || — || March 19, 2002 || Palomar || NEAT || — || align=right | 3.1 km || 
|-id=080 bgcolor=#E9E9E9
| 201080 ||  || — || March 19, 2002 || Palomar || NEAT || MAR || align=right | 1.7 km || 
|-id=081 bgcolor=#fefefe
| 201081 ||  || — || April 4, 2002 || Socorro || LINEAR || PHO || align=right | 1.6 km || 
|-id=082 bgcolor=#E9E9E9
| 201082 ||  || — || April 15, 2002 || Kitt Peak || Spacewatch || — || align=right | 1.8 km || 
|-id=083 bgcolor=#E9E9E9
| 201083 ||  || — || April 5, 2002 || Anderson Mesa || LONEOS || — || align=right | 2.2 km || 
|-id=084 bgcolor=#E9E9E9
| 201084 ||  || — || April 5, 2002 || Palomar || NEAT || — || align=right | 1.6 km || 
|-id=085 bgcolor=#fefefe
| 201085 ||  || — || April 8, 2002 || Palomar || NEAT || MAS || align=right | 1.1 km || 
|-id=086 bgcolor=#E9E9E9
| 201086 ||  || — || April 8, 2002 || Palomar || NEAT || — || align=right | 1.9 km || 
|-id=087 bgcolor=#fefefe
| 201087 ||  || — || April 8, 2002 || Palomar || NEAT || NYS || align=right | 1.1 km || 
|-id=088 bgcolor=#E9E9E9
| 201088 ||  || — || April 8, 2002 || Palomar || NEAT || — || align=right | 2.6 km || 
|-id=089 bgcolor=#E9E9E9
| 201089 ||  || — || April 9, 2002 || Socorro || LINEAR || — || align=right | 3.8 km || 
|-id=090 bgcolor=#E9E9E9
| 201090 ||  || — || April 10, 2002 || Socorro || LINEAR || — || align=right | 2.9 km || 
|-id=091 bgcolor=#E9E9E9
| 201091 ||  || — || April 9, 2002 || Socorro || LINEAR || — || align=right | 1.8 km || 
|-id=092 bgcolor=#E9E9E9
| 201092 ||  || — || April 9, 2002 || Socorro || LINEAR || — || align=right | 3.1 km || 
|-id=093 bgcolor=#E9E9E9
| 201093 ||  || — || April 9, 2002 || Socorro || LINEAR || — || align=right | 1.3 km || 
|-id=094 bgcolor=#fefefe
| 201094 ||  || — || April 9, 2002 || Socorro || LINEAR || NYS || align=right | 1.1 km || 
|-id=095 bgcolor=#fefefe
| 201095 ||  || — || April 10, 2002 || Socorro || LINEAR || MAS || align=right data-sort-value="0.98" | 980 m || 
|-id=096 bgcolor=#E9E9E9
| 201096 ||  || — || April 11, 2002 || Palomar || NEAT || — || align=right | 3.5 km || 
|-id=097 bgcolor=#fefefe
| 201097 ||  || — || April 11, 2002 || Socorro || LINEAR || — || align=right | 1.4 km || 
|-id=098 bgcolor=#fefefe
| 201098 ||  || — || April 10, 2002 || Socorro || LINEAR || NYS || align=right | 1.2 km || 
|-id=099 bgcolor=#E9E9E9
| 201099 ||  || — || April 12, 2002 || Socorro || LINEAR || — || align=right | 1.9 km || 
|-id=100 bgcolor=#E9E9E9
| 201100 ||  || — || April 12, 2002 || Socorro || LINEAR || — || align=right | 1.9 km || 
|}

201101–201200 

|-bgcolor=#E9E9E9
| 201101 ||  || — || April 12, 2002 || Socorro || LINEAR || — || align=right | 1.4 km || 
|-id=102 bgcolor=#E9E9E9
| 201102 ||  || — || April 13, 2002 || Palomar || NEAT || — || align=right | 1.3 km || 
|-id=103 bgcolor=#d6d6d6
| 201103 ||  || — || April 12, 2002 || Socorro || LINEAR || CHA || align=right | 2.8 km || 
|-id=104 bgcolor=#E9E9E9
| 201104 ||  || — || April 14, 2002 || Palomar || NEAT || — || align=right | 2.7 km || 
|-id=105 bgcolor=#E9E9E9
| 201105 ||  || — || April 14, 2002 || Socorro || LINEAR || — || align=right | 1.8 km || 
|-id=106 bgcolor=#E9E9E9
| 201106 ||  || — || April 13, 2002 || Palomar || NEAT || — || align=right | 1.5 km || 
|-id=107 bgcolor=#fefefe
| 201107 ||  || — || April 14, 2002 || Palomar || NEAT || NYS || align=right | 1.2 km || 
|-id=108 bgcolor=#E9E9E9
| 201108 ||  || — || April 11, 2002 || Socorro || LINEAR || — || align=right | 3.8 km || 
|-id=109 bgcolor=#E9E9E9
| 201109 ||  || — || April 10, 2002 || Palomar || NEAT || — || align=right | 2.1 km || 
|-id=110 bgcolor=#E9E9E9
| 201110 ||  || — || April 2, 2002 || Kitt Peak || Spacewatch || — || align=right | 1.2 km || 
|-id=111 bgcolor=#E9E9E9
| 201111 ||  || — || April 9, 2002 || Palomar || NEAT || — || align=right | 2.6 km || 
|-id=112 bgcolor=#E9E9E9
| 201112 || 2002 HG || — || April 16, 2002 || Ondřejov || P. Pravec || — || align=right | 1.9 km || 
|-id=113 bgcolor=#E9E9E9
| 201113 ||  || — || April 16, 2002 || Socorro || LINEAR || — || align=right | 2.2 km || 
|-id=114 bgcolor=#E9E9E9
| 201114 ||  || — || April 18, 2002 || Kitt Peak || Spacewatch || WIT || align=right | 1.6 km || 
|-id=115 bgcolor=#E9E9E9
| 201115 ||  || — || May 8, 2002 || Desert Eagle || W. K. Y. Yeung || PAE || align=right | 4.6 km || 
|-id=116 bgcolor=#fefefe
| 201116 ||  || — || May 8, 2002 || Socorro || LINEAR || H || align=right data-sort-value="0.88" | 880 m || 
|-id=117 bgcolor=#fefefe
| 201117 ||  || — || May 7, 2002 || Palomar || NEAT || — || align=right | 1.5 km || 
|-id=118 bgcolor=#E9E9E9
| 201118 ||  || — || May 9, 2002 || Socorro || LINEAR || — || align=right | 2.6 km || 
|-id=119 bgcolor=#E9E9E9
| 201119 ||  || — || May 9, 2002 || Socorro || LINEAR || MIT || align=right | 3.8 km || 
|-id=120 bgcolor=#E9E9E9
| 201120 ||  || — || May 9, 2002 || Socorro || LINEAR || — || align=right | 2.3 km || 
|-id=121 bgcolor=#E9E9E9
| 201121 ||  || — || May 8, 2002 || Socorro || LINEAR || KON || align=right | 3.8 km || 
|-id=122 bgcolor=#fefefe
| 201122 ||  || — || May 9, 2002 || Socorro || LINEAR || — || align=right | 1.5 km || 
|-id=123 bgcolor=#E9E9E9
| 201123 ||  || — || May 9, 2002 || Socorro || LINEAR || — || align=right | 3.6 km || 
|-id=124 bgcolor=#fefefe
| 201124 ||  || — || May 9, 2002 || Socorro || LINEAR || — || align=right | 1.4 km || 
|-id=125 bgcolor=#E9E9E9
| 201125 ||  || — || May 9, 2002 || Socorro || LINEAR || RAF || align=right | 1.7 km || 
|-id=126 bgcolor=#E9E9E9
| 201126 ||  || — || May 9, 2002 || Socorro || LINEAR || — || align=right | 1.6 km || 
|-id=127 bgcolor=#E9E9E9
| 201127 ||  || — || May 8, 2002 || Socorro || LINEAR || — || align=right | 2.1 km || 
|-id=128 bgcolor=#E9E9E9
| 201128 ||  || — || May 9, 2002 || Socorro || LINEAR || RAF || align=right | 2.1 km || 
|-id=129 bgcolor=#fefefe
| 201129 ||  || — || May 6, 2002 || Socorro || LINEAR || — || align=right | 2.1 km || 
|-id=130 bgcolor=#E9E9E9
| 201130 ||  || — || May 7, 2002 || Socorro || LINEAR || — || align=right | 1.7 km || 
|-id=131 bgcolor=#E9E9E9
| 201131 ||  || — || May 11, 2002 || Socorro || LINEAR || — || align=right | 1.7 km || 
|-id=132 bgcolor=#fefefe
| 201132 ||  || — || May 11, 2002 || Socorro || LINEAR || — || align=right | 2.3 km || 
|-id=133 bgcolor=#fefefe
| 201133 ||  || — || May 11, 2002 || Socorro || LINEAR || MAS || align=right | 1.3 km || 
|-id=134 bgcolor=#E9E9E9
| 201134 ||  || — || May 11, 2002 || Socorro || LINEAR || — || align=right | 3.4 km || 
|-id=135 bgcolor=#E9E9E9
| 201135 ||  || — || May 11, 2002 || Socorro || LINEAR || — || align=right | 1.4 km || 
|-id=136 bgcolor=#E9E9E9
| 201136 ||  || — || May 11, 2002 || Socorro || LINEAR || — || align=right | 3.7 km || 
|-id=137 bgcolor=#E9E9E9
| 201137 ||  || — || May 12, 2002 || Palomar || NEAT || — || align=right | 2.9 km || 
|-id=138 bgcolor=#E9E9E9
| 201138 ||  || — || May 8, 2002 || Socorro || LINEAR || — || align=right | 2.6 km || 
|-id=139 bgcolor=#E9E9E9
| 201139 ||  || — || May 9, 2002 || Socorro || LINEAR || BRU || align=right | 4.6 km || 
|-id=140 bgcolor=#fefefe
| 201140 ||  || — || May 6, 2002 || Socorro || LINEAR || PHO || align=right | 2.1 km || 
|-id=141 bgcolor=#E9E9E9
| 201141 ||  || — || May 10, 2002 || Socorro || LINEAR || — || align=right | 2.3 km || 
|-id=142 bgcolor=#E9E9E9
| 201142 ||  || — || May 13, 2002 || Socorro || LINEAR || — || align=right | 3.6 km || 
|-id=143 bgcolor=#E9E9E9
| 201143 ||  || — || May 11, 2002 || Socorro || LINEAR || ADE || align=right | 2.1 km || 
|-id=144 bgcolor=#fefefe
| 201144 ||  || — || May 4, 2002 || Palomar || NEAT || H || align=right data-sort-value="0.99" | 990 m || 
|-id=145 bgcolor=#fefefe
| 201145 ||  || — || May 7, 2002 || Palomar || NEAT || MAS || align=right | 1.2 km || 
|-id=146 bgcolor=#E9E9E9
| 201146 ||  || — || May 7, 2002 || Anderson Mesa || LONEOS || EUN || align=right | 1.8 km || 
|-id=147 bgcolor=#E9E9E9
| 201147 ||  || — || May 7, 2002 || Palomar || NEAT || — || align=right | 1.5 km || 
|-id=148 bgcolor=#E9E9E9
| 201148 ||  || — || May 8, 2002 || Socorro || LINEAR || — || align=right | 4.1 km || 
|-id=149 bgcolor=#E9E9E9
| 201149 ||  || — || May 9, 2002 || Palomar || NEAT || — || align=right | 1.4 km || 
|-id=150 bgcolor=#E9E9E9
| 201150 ||  || — || May 13, 2002 || Palomar || NEAT || — || align=right | 2.2 km || 
|-id=151 bgcolor=#E9E9E9
| 201151 ||  || — || May 14, 2002 || Anderson Mesa || LONEOS || — || align=right | 3.7 km || 
|-id=152 bgcolor=#d6d6d6
| 201152 || 2002 KL || — || May 16, 2002 || Socorro || LINEAR || — || align=right | 5.4 km || 
|-id=153 bgcolor=#E9E9E9
| 201153 ||  || — || May 16, 2002 || Socorro || LINEAR || — || align=right | 2.0 km || 
|-id=154 bgcolor=#E9E9E9
| 201154 ||  || — || May 16, 2002 || Socorro || LINEAR || — || align=right | 1.7 km || 
|-id=155 bgcolor=#E9E9E9
| 201155 ||  || — || May 16, 2002 || Socorro || LINEAR || — || align=right | 3.4 km || 
|-id=156 bgcolor=#fefefe
| 201156 ||  || — || May 18, 2002 || Socorro || LINEAR || NYS || align=right | 1.4 km || 
|-id=157 bgcolor=#E9E9E9
| 201157 ||  || — || June 6, 2002 || Socorro || LINEAR || — || align=right | 1.5 km || 
|-id=158 bgcolor=#E9E9E9
| 201158 ||  || — || June 6, 2002 || Socorro || LINEAR || JUN || align=right | 1.5 km || 
|-id=159 bgcolor=#E9E9E9
| 201159 ||  || — || June 6, 2002 || Socorro || LINEAR || — || align=right | 1.4 km || 
|-id=160 bgcolor=#E9E9E9
| 201160 ||  || — || June 9, 2002 || Palomar || NEAT || — || align=right | 2.7 km || 
|-id=161 bgcolor=#d6d6d6
| 201161 ||  || — || June 11, 2002 || Fountain Hills || C. W. Juels, P. R. Holvorcem || Tj (2.98) || align=right | 10 km || 
|-id=162 bgcolor=#E9E9E9
| 201162 ||  || — || June 10, 2002 || Socorro || LINEAR || — || align=right | 3.9 km || 
|-id=163 bgcolor=#E9E9E9
| 201163 ||  || — || June 12, 2002 || Palomar || NEAT || — || align=right | 2.9 km || 
|-id=164 bgcolor=#E9E9E9
| 201164 ||  || — || June 27, 2002 || Palomar || NEAT || EUN || align=right | 2.1 km || 
|-id=165 bgcolor=#E9E9E9
| 201165 ||  || — || July 9, 2002 || Palomar || NEAT || — || align=right | 4.0 km || 
|-id=166 bgcolor=#d6d6d6
| 201166 ||  || — || July 9, 2002 || Socorro || LINEAR || — || align=right | 4.6 km || 
|-id=167 bgcolor=#d6d6d6
| 201167 ||  || — || July 8, 2002 || Palomar || NEAT || HYG || align=right | 4.7 km || 
|-id=168 bgcolor=#E9E9E9
| 201168 ||  || — || July 14, 2002 || Palomar || NEAT || — || align=right | 4.3 km || 
|-id=169 bgcolor=#d6d6d6
| 201169 ||  || — || July 14, 2002 || Palomar || NEAT || THM || align=right | 2.7 km || 
|-id=170 bgcolor=#d6d6d6
| 201170 ||  || — || July 5, 2002 || Socorro || LINEAR || — || align=right | 6.0 km || 
|-id=171 bgcolor=#E9E9E9
| 201171 ||  || — || July 9, 2002 || Palomar || NEAT || — || align=right | 2.7 km || 
|-id=172 bgcolor=#fefefe
| 201172 ||  || — || July 17, 2002 || Socorro || LINEAR || H || align=right | 1.6 km || 
|-id=173 bgcolor=#d6d6d6
| 201173 ||  || — || July 20, 2002 || Palomar || NEAT || — || align=right | 3.8 km || 
|-id=174 bgcolor=#d6d6d6
| 201174 ||  || — || July 18, 2002 || Socorro || LINEAR || EOS || align=right | 2.7 km || 
|-id=175 bgcolor=#d6d6d6
| 201175 ||  || — || July 18, 2002 || Socorro || LINEAR || — || align=right | 4.1 km || 
|-id=176 bgcolor=#d6d6d6
| 201176 ||  || — || July 30, 2002 || Haleakala || NEAT || — || align=right | 3.4 km || 
|-id=177 bgcolor=#d6d6d6
| 201177 ||  || — || July 21, 2002 || Palomar || NEAT || — || align=right | 3.7 km || 
|-id=178 bgcolor=#d6d6d6
| 201178 ||  || — || August 4, 2002 || Palomar || NEAT || — || align=right | 5.6 km || 
|-id=179 bgcolor=#d6d6d6
| 201179 ||  || — || August 5, 2002 || Palomar || NEAT || CHA || align=right | 2.7 km || 
|-id=180 bgcolor=#d6d6d6
| 201180 ||  || — || August 5, 2002 || Palomar || NEAT || — || align=right | 5.3 km || 
|-id=181 bgcolor=#d6d6d6
| 201181 ||  || — || August 6, 2002 || Palomar || NEAT || — || align=right | 4.5 km || 
|-id=182 bgcolor=#d6d6d6
| 201182 ||  || — || August 6, 2002 || Campo Imperatore || CINEOS || — || align=right | 5.1 km || 
|-id=183 bgcolor=#d6d6d6
| 201183 ||  || — || August 7, 2002 || Palomar || NEAT || ALA || align=right | 4.7 km || 
|-id=184 bgcolor=#d6d6d6
| 201184 ||  || — || August 8, 2002 || Palomar || NEAT || EOS || align=right | 4.4 km || 
|-id=185 bgcolor=#d6d6d6
| 201185 ||  || — || August 6, 2002 || Palomar || NEAT || — || align=right | 4.4 km || 
|-id=186 bgcolor=#d6d6d6
| 201186 ||  || — || August 11, 2002 || Socorro || LINEAR || — || align=right | 4.9 km || 
|-id=187 bgcolor=#d6d6d6
| 201187 ||  || — || August 11, 2002 || Socorro || LINEAR || slow || align=right | 6.9 km || 
|-id=188 bgcolor=#d6d6d6
| 201188 ||  || — || August 12, 2002 || Socorro || LINEAR || — || align=right | 5.1 km || 
|-id=189 bgcolor=#d6d6d6
| 201189 ||  || — || August 12, 2002 || Socorro || LINEAR || — || align=right | 5.5 km || 
|-id=190 bgcolor=#d6d6d6
| 201190 ||  || — || August 12, 2002 || Socorro || LINEAR || — || align=right | 4.7 km || 
|-id=191 bgcolor=#d6d6d6
| 201191 ||  || — || August 12, 2002 || Socorro || LINEAR || EOS || align=right | 3.0 km || 
|-id=192 bgcolor=#d6d6d6
| 201192 ||  || — || August 11, 2002 || Socorro || LINEAR || — || align=right | 5.2 km || 
|-id=193 bgcolor=#d6d6d6
| 201193 ||  || — || August 13, 2002 || Socorro || LINEAR || — || align=right | 6.3 km || 
|-id=194 bgcolor=#E9E9E9
| 201194 ||  || — || August 12, 2002 || Haleakala || NEAT || AER || align=right | 2.0 km || 
|-id=195 bgcolor=#d6d6d6
| 201195 ||  || — || August 12, 2002 || Socorro || LINEAR || — || align=right | 3.6 km || 
|-id=196 bgcolor=#d6d6d6
| 201196 ||  || — || August 12, 2002 || Socorro || LINEAR || — || align=right | 3.6 km || 
|-id=197 bgcolor=#d6d6d6
| 201197 ||  || — || August 13, 2002 || Anderson Mesa || LONEOS || 7:4 || align=right | 8.0 km || 
|-id=198 bgcolor=#d6d6d6
| 201198 ||  || — || August 15, 2002 || Palomar || NEAT || — || align=right | 5.4 km || 
|-id=199 bgcolor=#E9E9E9
| 201199 ||  || — || August 15, 2002 || Palomar || NEAT || — || align=right | 2.7 km || 
|-id=200 bgcolor=#d6d6d6
| 201200 ||  || — || August 15, 2002 || Palomar || NEAT || — || align=right | 4.2 km || 
|}

201201–201300 

|-bgcolor=#d6d6d6
| 201201 ||  || — || August 14, 2002 || Palomar || NEAT || — || align=right | 6.2 km || 
|-id=202 bgcolor=#d6d6d6
| 201202 ||  || — || August 15, 2002 || Palomar || NEAT || EOS || align=right | 2.7 km || 
|-id=203 bgcolor=#d6d6d6
| 201203 ||  || — || August 15, 2002 || Palomar || NEAT || EOS || align=right | 2.1 km || 
|-id=204 bgcolor=#d6d6d6
| 201204 Stevewilliams ||  ||  || August 10, 2002 || Cerro Tololo || M. W. Buie || — || align=right | 2.4 km || 
|-id=205 bgcolor=#E9E9E9
| 201205 ||  || — || August 8, 2002 || Palomar || S. F. Hönig || MIS || align=right | 3.3 km || 
|-id=206 bgcolor=#d6d6d6
| 201206 ||  || — || August 8, 2002 || Palomar || A. Lowe || — || align=right | 2.8 km || 
|-id=207 bgcolor=#d6d6d6
| 201207 ||  || — || August 8, 2002 || Palomar || NEAT || — || align=right | 2.8 km || 
|-id=208 bgcolor=#d6d6d6
| 201208 ||  || — || August 8, 2002 || Palomar || NEAT || — || align=right | 2.6 km || 
|-id=209 bgcolor=#d6d6d6
| 201209 ||  || — || August 15, 2002 || Palomar || NEAT || KAR || align=right | 1.5 km || 
|-id=210 bgcolor=#d6d6d6
| 201210 ||  || — || August 4, 2002 || Palomar || NEAT || — || align=right | 4.0 km || 
|-id=211 bgcolor=#E9E9E9
| 201211 ||  || — || August 3, 2002 || Campo Imperatore || CINEOS || EUN || align=right | 1.9 km || 
|-id=212 bgcolor=#d6d6d6
| 201212 ||  || — || August 26, 2002 || Palomar || NEAT || — || align=right | 5.2 km || 
|-id=213 bgcolor=#d6d6d6
| 201213 ||  || — || August 29, 2002 || Palomar || NEAT || — || align=right | 5.4 km || 
|-id=214 bgcolor=#d6d6d6
| 201214 ||  || — || August 29, 2002 || Palomar || NEAT || — || align=right | 5.7 km || 
|-id=215 bgcolor=#d6d6d6
| 201215 ||  || — || August 31, 2002 || Socorro || LINEAR || — || align=right | 3.9 km || 
|-id=216 bgcolor=#d6d6d6
| 201216 ||  || — || August 31, 2002 || Anderson Mesa || LONEOS || EMA || align=right | 4.8 km || 
|-id=217 bgcolor=#d6d6d6
| 201217 ||  || — || August 29, 2002 || Palomar || R. Matson || — || align=right | 4.2 km || 
|-id=218 bgcolor=#d6d6d6
| 201218 ||  || — || August 29, 2002 || Palomar || S. F. Hönig || KOR || align=right | 2.4 km || 
|-id=219 bgcolor=#d6d6d6
| 201219 ||  || — || August 28, 2002 || Palomar || A. Lowe || — || align=right | 3.6 km || 
|-id=220 bgcolor=#d6d6d6
| 201220 ||  || — || August 18, 2002 || Palomar || NEAT || — || align=right | 3.0 km || 
|-id=221 bgcolor=#d6d6d6
| 201221 ||  || — || August 26, 2002 || Palomar || NEAT || — || align=right | 3.3 km || 
|-id=222 bgcolor=#d6d6d6
| 201222 ||  || — || August 20, 2002 || Palomar || NEAT || — || align=right | 3.8 km || 
|-id=223 bgcolor=#d6d6d6
| 201223 ||  || — || August 17, 2002 || Palomar || NEAT || — || align=right | 3.6 km || 
|-id=224 bgcolor=#d6d6d6
| 201224 ||  || — || August 29, 2002 || Palomar || NEAT || — || align=right | 3.8 km || 
|-id=225 bgcolor=#E9E9E9
| 201225 ||  || — || August 26, 2002 || Palomar || NEAT || — || align=right | 3.1 km || 
|-id=226 bgcolor=#d6d6d6
| 201226 ||  || — || August 30, 2002 || Anderson Mesa || LONEOS || EOS || align=right | 5.7 km || 
|-id=227 bgcolor=#d6d6d6
| 201227 ||  || — || August 27, 2002 || Palomar || NEAT || — || align=right | 2.9 km || 
|-id=228 bgcolor=#E9E9E9
| 201228 ||  || — || August 19, 2002 || Palomar || NEAT || GEF || align=right | 1.9 km || 
|-id=229 bgcolor=#d6d6d6
| 201229 ||  || — || August 30, 2002 || Palomar || NEAT || — || align=right | 2.9 km || 
|-id=230 bgcolor=#E9E9E9
| 201230 ||  || — || August 19, 2002 || Palomar || NEAT || — || align=right | 4.2 km || 
|-id=231 bgcolor=#d6d6d6
| 201231 ||  || — || August 29, 2002 || Palomar || NEAT || — || align=right | 4.5 km || 
|-id=232 bgcolor=#d6d6d6
| 201232 ||  || — || September 3, 2002 || Palomar || NEAT || 629 || align=right | 2.2 km || 
|-id=233 bgcolor=#d6d6d6
| 201233 ||  || — || September 3, 2002 || Campo Imperatore || CINEOS || — || align=right | 4.8 km || 
|-id=234 bgcolor=#d6d6d6
| 201234 ||  || — || September 4, 2002 || Anderson Mesa || LONEOS || — || align=right | 5.9 km || 
|-id=235 bgcolor=#d6d6d6
| 201235 ||  || — || September 4, 2002 || Anderson Mesa || LONEOS || — || align=right | 5.1 km || 
|-id=236 bgcolor=#E9E9E9
| 201236 ||  || — || September 4, 2002 || Anderson Mesa || LONEOS || — || align=right | 3.6 km || 
|-id=237 bgcolor=#d6d6d6
| 201237 ||  || — || September 4, 2002 || Anderson Mesa || LONEOS || — || align=right | 3.7 km || 
|-id=238 bgcolor=#d6d6d6
| 201238 ||  || — || September 5, 2002 || Socorro || LINEAR || — || align=right | 4.4 km || 
|-id=239 bgcolor=#d6d6d6
| 201239 ||  || — || September 5, 2002 || Socorro || LINEAR || — || align=right | 4.6 km || 
|-id=240 bgcolor=#d6d6d6
| 201240 ||  || — || September 5, 2002 || Socorro || LINEAR || — || align=right | 3.7 km || 
|-id=241 bgcolor=#d6d6d6
| 201241 ||  || — || September 5, 2002 || Socorro || LINEAR || — || align=right | 4.4 km || 
|-id=242 bgcolor=#d6d6d6
| 201242 ||  || — || September 5, 2002 || Socorro || LINEAR || KOR || align=right | 2.3 km || 
|-id=243 bgcolor=#d6d6d6
| 201243 ||  || — || September 5, 2002 || Socorro || LINEAR || — || align=right | 5.8 km || 
|-id=244 bgcolor=#d6d6d6
| 201244 ||  || — || September 5, 2002 || Socorro || LINEAR || — || align=right | 4.3 km || 
|-id=245 bgcolor=#d6d6d6
| 201245 ||  || — || September 5, 2002 || Socorro || LINEAR || — || align=right | 4.6 km || 
|-id=246 bgcolor=#d6d6d6
| 201246 ||  || — || September 5, 2002 || Socorro || LINEAR || HYG || align=right | 5.0 km || 
|-id=247 bgcolor=#d6d6d6
| 201247 ||  || — || September 5, 2002 || Socorro || LINEAR || EUP || align=right | 4.7 km || 
|-id=248 bgcolor=#d6d6d6
| 201248 ||  || — || September 5, 2002 || Socorro || LINEAR || — || align=right | 5.2 km || 
|-id=249 bgcolor=#d6d6d6
| 201249 ||  || — || September 5, 2002 || Socorro || LINEAR || — || align=right | 6.0 km || 
|-id=250 bgcolor=#d6d6d6
| 201250 ||  || — || September 5, 2002 || Socorro || LINEAR || EOS || align=right | 3.2 km || 
|-id=251 bgcolor=#d6d6d6
| 201251 ||  || — || September 5, 2002 || Socorro || LINEAR || — || align=right | 6.2 km || 
|-id=252 bgcolor=#d6d6d6
| 201252 ||  || — || September 7, 2002 || Socorro || LINEAR || — || align=right | 3.2 km || 
|-id=253 bgcolor=#d6d6d6
| 201253 ||  || — || September 7, 2002 || Campo Imperatore || CINEOS || HYG || align=right | 4.6 km || 
|-id=254 bgcolor=#d6d6d6
| 201254 ||  || — || September 8, 2002 || Haleakala || NEAT || HYG || align=right | 4.0 km || 
|-id=255 bgcolor=#d6d6d6
| 201255 ||  || — || September 9, 2002 || Palomar || NEAT || EOS || align=right | 2.7 km || 
|-id=256 bgcolor=#d6d6d6
| 201256 ||  || — || September 11, 2002 || Palomar || NEAT || — || align=right | 5.3 km || 
|-id=257 bgcolor=#d6d6d6
| 201257 ||  || — || September 10, 2002 || Palomar || NEAT || NAE || align=right | 4.9 km || 
|-id=258 bgcolor=#d6d6d6
| 201258 ||  || — || September 10, 2002 || Palomar || NEAT || — || align=right | 4.5 km || 
|-id=259 bgcolor=#d6d6d6
| 201259 ||  || — || September 10, 2002 || Haleakala || NEAT || EOS || align=right | 3.7 km || 
|-id=260 bgcolor=#d6d6d6
| 201260 ||  || — || September 11, 2002 || Palomar || NEAT || — || align=right | 4.0 km || 
|-id=261 bgcolor=#E9E9E9
| 201261 ||  || — || September 12, 2002 || Palomar || NEAT || — || align=right | 3.9 km || 
|-id=262 bgcolor=#d6d6d6
| 201262 ||  || — || September 12, 2002 || Palomar || NEAT || — || align=right | 4.5 km || 
|-id=263 bgcolor=#d6d6d6
| 201263 ||  || — || September 12, 2002 || Palomar || NEAT || — || align=right | 3.6 km || 
|-id=264 bgcolor=#d6d6d6
| 201264 ||  || — || September 12, 2002 || Palomar || NEAT || — || align=right | 3.3 km || 
|-id=265 bgcolor=#d6d6d6
| 201265 ||  || — || September 13, 2002 || Palomar || NEAT || — || align=right | 4.0 km || 
|-id=266 bgcolor=#d6d6d6
| 201266 ||  || — || September 13, 2002 || Palomar || NEAT || EOS || align=right | 2.9 km || 
|-id=267 bgcolor=#d6d6d6
| 201267 ||  || — || September 11, 2002 || Palomar || NEAT || — || align=right | 6.7 km || 
|-id=268 bgcolor=#d6d6d6
| 201268 ||  || — || September 12, 2002 || Palomar || NEAT || — || align=right | 5.5 km || 
|-id=269 bgcolor=#d6d6d6
| 201269 ||  || — || September 12, 2002 || Palomar || NEAT || — || align=right | 4.5 km || 
|-id=270 bgcolor=#d6d6d6
| 201270 ||  || — || September 14, 2002 || Palomar || NEAT || — || align=right | 3.8 km || 
|-id=271 bgcolor=#d6d6d6
| 201271 ||  || — || September 13, 2002 || Socorro || LINEAR || — || align=right | 4.7 km || 
|-id=272 bgcolor=#d6d6d6
| 201272 ||  || — || September 13, 2002 || Socorro || LINEAR || — || align=right | 6.2 km || 
|-id=273 bgcolor=#d6d6d6
| 201273 ||  || — || September 15, 2002 || Kitt Peak || Spacewatch || — || align=right | 2.9 km || 
|-id=274 bgcolor=#d6d6d6
| 201274 ||  || — || September 13, 2002 || Palomar || NEAT || — || align=right | 4.7 km || 
|-id=275 bgcolor=#d6d6d6
| 201275 ||  || — || September 14, 2002 || Haleakala || NEAT || — || align=right | 7.1 km || 
|-id=276 bgcolor=#d6d6d6
| 201276 ||  || — || September 15, 2002 || Palomar || NEAT || — || align=right | 3.4 km || 
|-id=277 bgcolor=#d6d6d6
| 201277 ||  || — || September 14, 2002 || Palomar || R. Matson || EOS || align=right | 5.4 km || 
|-id=278 bgcolor=#d6d6d6
| 201278 ||  || — || September 12, 2002 || Palomar || NEAT || — || align=right | 5.5 km || 
|-id=279 bgcolor=#d6d6d6
| 201279 ||  || — || September 4, 2002 || Palomar || NEAT || — || align=right | 3.1 km || 
|-id=280 bgcolor=#d6d6d6
| 201280 ||  || — || September 13, 2002 || Palomar || NEAT || — || align=right | 3.4 km || 
|-id=281 bgcolor=#d6d6d6
| 201281 ||  || — || September 14, 2002 || Palomar || NEAT || KOR || align=right | 1.7 km || 
|-id=282 bgcolor=#d6d6d6
| 201282 ||  || — || September 14, 2002 || Palomar || NEAT || — || align=right | 3.7 km || 
|-id=283 bgcolor=#d6d6d6
| 201283 ||  || — || September 14, 2002 || Palomar || NEAT || — || align=right | 3.2 km || 
|-id=284 bgcolor=#d6d6d6
| 201284 ||  || — || September 27, 2002 || Palomar || NEAT || — || align=right | 5.5 km || 
|-id=285 bgcolor=#d6d6d6
| 201285 ||  || — || September 27, 2002 || Palomar || NEAT || THM || align=right | 3.1 km || 
|-id=286 bgcolor=#d6d6d6
| 201286 ||  || — || September 27, 2002 || Palomar || NEAT || — || align=right | 6.0 km || 
|-id=287 bgcolor=#d6d6d6
| 201287 ||  || — || September 27, 2002 || Palomar || NEAT || — || align=right | 6.3 km || 
|-id=288 bgcolor=#d6d6d6
| 201288 ||  || — || September 27, 2002 || Palomar || NEAT || — || align=right | 3.1 km || 
|-id=289 bgcolor=#d6d6d6
| 201289 ||  || — || September 27, 2002 || Socorro || LINEAR || — || align=right | 5.7 km || 
|-id=290 bgcolor=#d6d6d6
| 201290 ||  || — || September 29, 2002 || Haleakala || NEAT || KOR || align=right | 3.0 km || 
|-id=291 bgcolor=#d6d6d6
| 201291 ||  || — || September 30, 2002 || Socorro || LINEAR || — || align=right | 4.2 km || 
|-id=292 bgcolor=#E9E9E9
| 201292 ||  || — || September 29, 2002 || Haleakala || NEAT || — || align=right | 4.5 km || 
|-id=293 bgcolor=#d6d6d6
| 201293 ||  || — || September 18, 2002 || Palomar || NEAT || — || align=right | 5.4 km || 
|-id=294 bgcolor=#d6d6d6
| 201294 ||  || — || September 20, 2002 || Palomar || NEAT || URS || align=right | 6.6 km || 
|-id=295 bgcolor=#d6d6d6
| 201295 ||  || — || September 30, 2002 || Socorro || LINEAR || — || align=right | 4.6 km || 
|-id=296 bgcolor=#d6d6d6
| 201296 ||  || — || September 30, 2002 || Haleakala || NEAT || — || align=right | 5.9 km || 
|-id=297 bgcolor=#d6d6d6
| 201297 ||  || — || September 16, 2002 || Palomar || NEAT || — || align=right | 3.9 km || 
|-id=298 bgcolor=#d6d6d6
| 201298 ||  || — || September 19, 2002 || Palomar || NEAT || — || align=right | 4.8 km || 
|-id=299 bgcolor=#d6d6d6
| 201299 ||  || — || September 16, 2002 || Palomar || NEAT || — || align=right | 3.1 km || 
|-id=300 bgcolor=#d6d6d6
| 201300 ||  || — || October 1, 2002 || Anderson Mesa || LONEOS || — || align=right | 5.4 km || 
|}

201301–201400 

|-bgcolor=#d6d6d6
| 201301 ||  || — || October 1, 2002 || Haleakala || NEAT || MEL || align=right | 4.8 km || 
|-id=302 bgcolor=#d6d6d6
| 201302 ||  || — || October 1, 2002 || Anderson Mesa || LONEOS || — || align=right | 4.3 km || 
|-id=303 bgcolor=#d6d6d6
| 201303 ||  || — || October 1, 2002 || Anderson Mesa || LONEOS || — || align=right | 5.2 km || 
|-id=304 bgcolor=#d6d6d6
| 201304 ||  || — || October 2, 2002 || Socorro || LINEAR || — || align=right | 4.6 km || 
|-id=305 bgcolor=#d6d6d6
| 201305 ||  || — || October 2, 2002 || Socorro || LINEAR || — || align=right | 6.2 km || 
|-id=306 bgcolor=#d6d6d6
| 201306 ||  || — || October 3, 2002 || Campo Imperatore || CINEOS || HYG || align=right | 4.7 km || 
|-id=307 bgcolor=#d6d6d6
| 201307 ||  || — || October 2, 2002 || Kvistaberg || UDAS || — || align=right | 3.7 km || 
|-id=308 bgcolor=#d6d6d6
| 201308 Hansgrade ||  ||  || October 10, 2002 || Michael Adrian || M. Kretlow || — || align=right | 5.1 km || 
|-id=309 bgcolor=#d6d6d6
| 201309 ||  || — || October 2, 2002 || Campo Imperatore || CINEOS || — || align=right | 4.0 km || 
|-id=310 bgcolor=#d6d6d6
| 201310 ||  || — || October 3, 2002 || Palomar || NEAT || — || align=right | 5.1 km || 
|-id=311 bgcolor=#fefefe
| 201311 ||  || — || October 3, 2002 || Socorro || LINEAR || V || align=right | 1.0 km || 
|-id=312 bgcolor=#d6d6d6
| 201312 ||  || — || October 1, 2002 || Anderson Mesa || LONEOS || — || align=right | 4.1 km || 
|-id=313 bgcolor=#d6d6d6
| 201313 ||  || — || October 3, 2002 || Palomar || NEAT || EOS || align=right | 3.7 km || 
|-id=314 bgcolor=#d6d6d6
| 201314 ||  || — || October 2, 2002 || Campo Imperatore || CINEOS || EOS || align=right | 4.2 km || 
|-id=315 bgcolor=#d6d6d6
| 201315 ||  || — || October 3, 2002 || Socorro || LINEAR || — || align=right | 4.6 km || 
|-id=316 bgcolor=#d6d6d6
| 201316 ||  || — || October 3, 2002 || Socorro || LINEAR || EOS || align=right | 3.1 km || 
|-id=317 bgcolor=#d6d6d6
| 201317 ||  || — || October 3, 2002 || Palomar || NEAT || — || align=right | 5.4 km || 
|-id=318 bgcolor=#d6d6d6
| 201318 ||  || — || October 3, 2002 || Palomar || NEAT || VER || align=right | 6.7 km || 
|-id=319 bgcolor=#d6d6d6
| 201319 ||  || — || October 3, 2002 || Palomar || NEAT || EMA || align=right | 6.7 km || 
|-id=320 bgcolor=#d6d6d6
| 201320 ||  || — || October 3, 2002 || Palomar || NEAT || — || align=right | 7.9 km || 
|-id=321 bgcolor=#d6d6d6
| 201321 ||  || — || October 4, 2002 || Palomar || NEAT || EOS || align=right | 3.5 km || 
|-id=322 bgcolor=#E9E9E9
| 201322 ||  || — || October 4, 2002 || Socorro || LINEAR || AGN || align=right | 2.5 km || 
|-id=323 bgcolor=#d6d6d6
| 201323 ||  || — || October 4, 2002 || Palomar || NEAT || VER || align=right | 5.2 km || 
|-id=324 bgcolor=#d6d6d6
| 201324 ||  || — || October 4, 2002 || Palomar || NEAT || — || align=right | 5.1 km || 
|-id=325 bgcolor=#d6d6d6
| 201325 ||  || — || October 4, 2002 || Socorro || LINEAR || — || align=right | 5.8 km || 
|-id=326 bgcolor=#d6d6d6
| 201326 ||  || — || October 4, 2002 || Anderson Mesa || LONEOS || EOS || align=right | 3.3 km || 
|-id=327 bgcolor=#d6d6d6
| 201327 ||  || — || October 4, 2002 || Anderson Mesa || LONEOS || TEL || align=right | 2.7 km || 
|-id=328 bgcolor=#d6d6d6
| 201328 ||  || — || October 5, 2002 || Socorro || LINEAR || — || align=right | 5.5 km || 
|-id=329 bgcolor=#d6d6d6
| 201329 ||  || — || October 4, 2002 || Socorro || LINEAR || HYG || align=right | 3.4 km || 
|-id=330 bgcolor=#d6d6d6
| 201330 ||  || — || October 5, 2002 || Palomar || NEAT || EOS || align=right | 3.5 km || 
|-id=331 bgcolor=#d6d6d6
| 201331 ||  || — || October 5, 2002 || Palomar || NEAT || — || align=right | 3.8 km || 
|-id=332 bgcolor=#d6d6d6
| 201332 ||  || — || October 5, 2002 || Palomar || NEAT || TIR || align=right | 5.4 km || 
|-id=333 bgcolor=#d6d6d6
| 201333 ||  || — || October 5, 2002 || Palomar || NEAT || EUP || align=right | 6.6 km || 
|-id=334 bgcolor=#E9E9E9
| 201334 ||  || — || October 3, 2002 || Palomar || NEAT || EUN || align=right | 2.1 km || 
|-id=335 bgcolor=#d6d6d6
| 201335 ||  || — || October 3, 2002 || Palomar || NEAT || ALA || align=right | 7.2 km || 
|-id=336 bgcolor=#d6d6d6
| 201336 ||  || — || October 3, 2002 || Palomar || NEAT || — || align=right | 7.0 km || 
|-id=337 bgcolor=#d6d6d6
| 201337 ||  || — || October 3, 2002 || Palomar || NEAT || — || align=right | 6.6 km || 
|-id=338 bgcolor=#d6d6d6
| 201338 ||  || — || October 4, 2002 || Socorro || LINEAR || — || align=right | 3.8 km || 
|-id=339 bgcolor=#d6d6d6
| 201339 ||  || — || October 5, 2002 || Socorro || LINEAR || — || align=right | 5.2 km || 
|-id=340 bgcolor=#d6d6d6
| 201340 ||  || — || October 4, 2002 || Socorro || LINEAR || — || align=right | 4.4 km || 
|-id=341 bgcolor=#d6d6d6
| 201341 ||  || — || October 4, 2002 || Palomar || NEAT || — || align=right | 7.1 km || 
|-id=342 bgcolor=#d6d6d6
| 201342 ||  || — || October 5, 2002 || Socorro || LINEAR || EOS || align=right | 5.1 km || 
|-id=343 bgcolor=#d6d6d6
| 201343 ||  || — || October 5, 2002 || Socorro || LINEAR || EOS || align=right | 3.0 km || 
|-id=344 bgcolor=#d6d6d6
| 201344 ||  || — || October 5, 2002 || Anderson Mesa || LONEOS || — || align=right | 4.7 km || 
|-id=345 bgcolor=#d6d6d6
| 201345 ||  || — || October 5, 2002 || Anderson Mesa || LONEOS || — || align=right | 4.8 km || 
|-id=346 bgcolor=#d6d6d6
| 201346 ||  || — || October 5, 2002 || Anderson Mesa || LONEOS || — || align=right | 6.9 km || 
|-id=347 bgcolor=#d6d6d6
| 201347 ||  || — || October 5, 2002 || Socorro || LINEAR || — || align=right | 5.5 km || 
|-id=348 bgcolor=#d6d6d6
| 201348 ||  || — || October 4, 2002 || Socorro || LINEAR || — || align=right | 5.9 km || 
|-id=349 bgcolor=#d6d6d6
| 201349 ||  || — || October 7, 2002 || Socorro || LINEAR || — || align=right | 4.7 km || 
|-id=350 bgcolor=#d6d6d6
| 201350 ||  || — || October 7, 2002 || Socorro || LINEAR || — || align=right | 5.2 km || 
|-id=351 bgcolor=#d6d6d6
| 201351 ||  || — || October 7, 2002 || Palomar || NEAT || — || align=right | 5.0 km || 
|-id=352 bgcolor=#d6d6d6
| 201352 ||  || — || October 4, 2002 || Socorro || LINEAR || — || align=right | 5.3 km || 
|-id=353 bgcolor=#d6d6d6
| 201353 ||  || — || October 5, 2002 || Anderson Mesa || LONEOS || — || align=right | 5.0 km || 
|-id=354 bgcolor=#d6d6d6
| 201354 ||  || — || October 7, 2002 || Socorro || LINEAR || — || align=right | 4.8 km || 
|-id=355 bgcolor=#d6d6d6
| 201355 ||  || — || October 7, 2002 || Socorro || LINEAR || — || align=right | 6.1 km || 
|-id=356 bgcolor=#d6d6d6
| 201356 ||  || — || October 8, 2002 || Anderson Mesa || LONEOS || VER || align=right | 5.8 km || 
|-id=357 bgcolor=#d6d6d6
| 201357 ||  || — || October 8, 2002 || Palomar || NEAT || — || align=right | 5.3 km || 
|-id=358 bgcolor=#d6d6d6
| 201358 ||  || — || October 6, 2002 || Anderson Mesa || LONEOS || ALA || align=right | 6.8 km || 
|-id=359 bgcolor=#d6d6d6
| 201359 ||  || — || October 6, 2002 || Haleakala || NEAT || — || align=right | 5.3 km || 
|-id=360 bgcolor=#d6d6d6
| 201360 ||  || — || October 9, 2002 || Socorro || LINEAR || ALA || align=right | 6.9 km || 
|-id=361 bgcolor=#d6d6d6
| 201361 ||  || — || October 9, 2002 || Socorro || LINEAR || HYG || align=right | 5.4 km || 
|-id=362 bgcolor=#d6d6d6
| 201362 ||  || — || October 7, 2002 || Palomar || NEAT || — || align=right | 3.8 km || 
|-id=363 bgcolor=#d6d6d6
| 201363 ||  || — || October 8, 2002 || Anderson Mesa || LONEOS || — || align=right | 3.8 km || 
|-id=364 bgcolor=#d6d6d6
| 201364 ||  || — || October 8, 2002 || Anderson Mesa || LONEOS || 7:4 || align=right | 6.4 km || 
|-id=365 bgcolor=#d6d6d6
| 201365 ||  || — || October 10, 2002 || Kitt Peak || Spacewatch || HYG || align=right | 3.4 km || 
|-id=366 bgcolor=#d6d6d6
| 201366 ||  || — || October 10, 2002 || Socorro || LINEAR || — || align=right | 6.1 km || 
|-id=367 bgcolor=#d6d6d6
| 201367 ||  || — || October 9, 2002 || Socorro || LINEAR || — || align=right | 5.0 km || 
|-id=368 bgcolor=#d6d6d6
| 201368 ||  || — || October 9, 2002 || Socorro || LINEAR || EOS || align=right | 3.9 km || 
|-id=369 bgcolor=#d6d6d6
| 201369 ||  || — || October 10, 2002 || Socorro || LINEAR || EOS || align=right | 4.3 km || 
|-id=370 bgcolor=#d6d6d6
| 201370 ||  || — || October 10, 2002 || Socorro || LINEAR || — || align=right | 6.9 km || 
|-id=371 bgcolor=#d6d6d6
| 201371 ||  || — || October 5, 2002 || Apache Point || SDSS || — || align=right | 3.2 km || 
|-id=372 bgcolor=#d6d6d6
| 201372 Sheldon ||  ||  || October 10, 2002 || Apache Point || SDSS || — || align=right | 3.3 km || 
|-id=373 bgcolor=#d6d6d6
| 201373 ||  || — || October 4, 2002 || Palomar || NEAT || — || align=right | 4.3 km || 
|-id=374 bgcolor=#d6d6d6
| 201374 ||  || — || October 9, 2002 || Palomar || NEAT || KOR || align=right | 1.6 km || 
|-id=375 bgcolor=#d6d6d6
| 201375 ||  || — || October 28, 2002 || Palomar || NEAT || — || align=right | 4.3 km || 
|-id=376 bgcolor=#d6d6d6
| 201376 ||  || — || October 28, 2002 || Palomar || NEAT || — || align=right | 4.2 km || 
|-id=377 bgcolor=#d6d6d6
| 201377 ||  || — || October 30, 2002 || Palomar || NEAT || ALA || align=right | 7.3 km || 
|-id=378 bgcolor=#d6d6d6
| 201378 ||  || — || October 30, 2002 || Socorro || LINEAR || TIR || align=right | 5.0 km || 
|-id=379 bgcolor=#d6d6d6
| 201379 ||  || — || October 31, 2002 || Socorro || LINEAR || — || align=right | 7.5 km || 
|-id=380 bgcolor=#d6d6d6
| 201380 ||  || — || October 30, 2002 || Socorro || LINEAR || TIR || align=right | 4.6 km || 
|-id=381 bgcolor=#d6d6d6
| 201381 ||  || — || October 31, 2002 || Palomar || NEAT || — || align=right | 5.3 km || 
|-id=382 bgcolor=#d6d6d6
| 201382 ||  || — || October 31, 2002 || Socorro || LINEAR || TIR || align=right | 4.0 km || 
|-id=383 bgcolor=#d6d6d6
| 201383 ||  || — || October 30, 2002 || Apache Point || SDSS || — || align=right | 5.5 km || 
|-id=384 bgcolor=#d6d6d6
| 201384 ||  || — || October 31, 2002 || Palomar || NEAT || — || align=right | 4.9 km || 
|-id=385 bgcolor=#d6d6d6
| 201385 ||  || — || November 2, 2002 || Haleakala || NEAT || THM || align=right | 3.0 km || 
|-id=386 bgcolor=#d6d6d6
| 201386 ||  || — || November 1, 2002 || Palomar || NEAT || — || align=right | 6.3 km || 
|-id=387 bgcolor=#d6d6d6
| 201387 ||  || — || November 6, 2002 || Needville || Needville Obs. || — || align=right | 5.6 km || 
|-id=388 bgcolor=#d6d6d6
| 201388 ||  || — || November 5, 2002 || Socorro || LINEAR || — || align=right | 6.4 km || 
|-id=389 bgcolor=#d6d6d6
| 201389 ||  || — || November 4, 2002 || Palomar || NEAT || THM || align=right | 5.1 km || 
|-id=390 bgcolor=#d6d6d6
| 201390 ||  || — || November 5, 2002 || Socorro || LINEAR || — || align=right | 4.8 km || 
|-id=391 bgcolor=#d6d6d6
| 201391 ||  || — || November 5, 2002 || Socorro || LINEAR || EOS || align=right | 3.3 km || 
|-id=392 bgcolor=#d6d6d6
| 201392 ||  || — || November 2, 2002 || Haleakala || NEAT || EOS || align=right | 3.6 km || 
|-id=393 bgcolor=#d6d6d6
| 201393 ||  || — || November 5, 2002 || Palomar || NEAT || — || align=right | 6.8 km || 
|-id=394 bgcolor=#d6d6d6
| 201394 ||  || — || November 6, 2002 || Anderson Mesa || LONEOS || — || align=right | 5.7 km || 
|-id=395 bgcolor=#d6d6d6
| 201395 ||  || — || November 6, 2002 || Socorro || LINEAR || — || align=right | 5.3 km || 
|-id=396 bgcolor=#d6d6d6
| 201396 ||  || — || November 5, 2002 || Socorro || LINEAR || EUP || align=right | 5.2 km || 
|-id=397 bgcolor=#E9E9E9
| 201397 ||  || — || November 7, 2002 || Socorro || LINEAR || GEF || align=right | 2.3 km || 
|-id=398 bgcolor=#d6d6d6
| 201398 ||  || — || November 7, 2002 || Socorro || LINEAR || — || align=right | 3.4 km || 
|-id=399 bgcolor=#d6d6d6
| 201399 ||  || — || November 7, 2002 || Socorro || LINEAR || — || align=right | 3.6 km || 
|-id=400 bgcolor=#d6d6d6
| 201400 ||  || — || November 7, 2002 || Socorro || LINEAR || — || align=right | 3.7 km || 
|}

201401–201500 

|-bgcolor=#d6d6d6
| 201401 ||  || — || November 11, 2002 || Kitt Peak || Spacewatch || — || align=right | 3.8 km || 
|-id=402 bgcolor=#d6d6d6
| 201402 ||  || — || November 11, 2002 || Anderson Mesa || LONEOS || MEL || align=right | 5.0 km || 
|-id=403 bgcolor=#d6d6d6
| 201403 ||  || — || November 11, 2002 || Anderson Mesa || LONEOS || ALA || align=right | 7.4 km || 
|-id=404 bgcolor=#d6d6d6
| 201404 ||  || — || November 11, 2002 || Socorro || LINEAR || — || align=right | 5.0 km || 
|-id=405 bgcolor=#d6d6d6
| 201405 ||  || — || November 11, 2002 || Socorro || LINEAR || HYG || align=right | 4.3 km || 
|-id=406 bgcolor=#d6d6d6
| 201406 ||  || — || November 12, 2002 || Socorro || LINEAR || — || align=right | 3.5 km || 
|-id=407 bgcolor=#d6d6d6
| 201407 ||  || — || November 11, 2002 || Socorro || LINEAR || ALA || align=right | 8.4 km || 
|-id=408 bgcolor=#d6d6d6
| 201408 ||  || — || November 11, 2002 || Socorro || LINEAR || ALA || align=right | 7.1 km || 
|-id=409 bgcolor=#d6d6d6
| 201409 ||  || — || November 13, 2002 || Palomar || NEAT || TEL || align=right | 2.2 km || 
|-id=410 bgcolor=#d6d6d6
| 201410 || 2002 WB || — || November 16, 2002 || Anderson Mesa || LONEOS || — || align=right | 4.8 km || 
|-id=411 bgcolor=#d6d6d6
| 201411 ||  || — || November 24, 2002 || Palomar || NEAT || HYG || align=right | 4.4 km || 
|-id=412 bgcolor=#d6d6d6
| 201412 ||  || — || November 24, 2002 || Palomar || NEAT || HYG || align=right | 4.2 km || 
|-id=413 bgcolor=#d6d6d6
| 201413 ||  || — || November 28, 2002 || Anderson Mesa || LONEOS || EOS || align=right | 3.6 km || 
|-id=414 bgcolor=#d6d6d6
| 201414 || 2002 XT || — || December 1, 2002 || Socorro || LINEAR || — || align=right | 4.7 km || 
|-id=415 bgcolor=#d6d6d6
| 201415 ||  || — || December 3, 2002 || Haleakala || NEAT || THM || align=right | 4.9 km || 
|-id=416 bgcolor=#d6d6d6
| 201416 ||  || — || December 3, 2002 || Palomar || NEAT || — || align=right | 6.6 km || 
|-id=417 bgcolor=#d6d6d6
| 201417 ||  || — || December 6, 2002 || Socorro || LINEAR || MEL || align=right | 7.9 km || 
|-id=418 bgcolor=#d6d6d6
| 201418 ||  || — || December 5, 2002 || Socorro || LINEAR || — || align=right | 4.7 km || 
|-id=419 bgcolor=#d6d6d6
| 201419 ||  || — || December 6, 2002 || Socorro || LINEAR || TIR || align=right | 5.8 km || 
|-id=420 bgcolor=#d6d6d6
| 201420 ||  || — || December 9, 2002 || Anderson Mesa || LONEOS || EOS || align=right | 3.7 km || 
|-id=421 bgcolor=#d6d6d6
| 201421 ||  || — || December 11, 2002 || Socorro || LINEAR || MEL || align=right | 6.4 km || 
|-id=422 bgcolor=#d6d6d6
| 201422 ||  || — || December 14, 2002 || Socorro || LINEAR || — || align=right | 5.4 km || 
|-id=423 bgcolor=#d6d6d6
| 201423 ||  || — || December 7, 2002 || Apache Point || SDSS || — || align=right | 2.7 km || 
|-id=424 bgcolor=#fefefe
| 201424 ||  || — || December 30, 2002 || Bohyunsan || Y.-B. Jeon, B.-C. Lee || — || align=right | 1.3 km || 
|-id=425 bgcolor=#fefefe
| 201425 ||  || — || December 31, 2002 || Socorro || LINEAR || — || align=right | 1.4 km || 
|-id=426 bgcolor=#d6d6d6
| 201426 ||  || — || January 2, 2003 || Socorro || LINEAR || — || align=right | 6.7 km || 
|-id=427 bgcolor=#fefefe
| 201427 ||  || — || January 4, 2003 || Socorro || LINEAR || — || align=right | 1.1 km || 
|-id=428 bgcolor=#fefefe
| 201428 ||  || — || January 5, 2003 || Socorro || LINEAR || — || align=right | 1.1 km || 
|-id=429 bgcolor=#d6d6d6
| 201429 ||  || — || January 7, 2003 || Socorro || LINEAR || — || align=right | 5.6 km || 
|-id=430 bgcolor=#d6d6d6
| 201430 ||  || — || January 7, 2003 || Socorro || LINEAR || — || align=right | 6.9 km || 
|-id=431 bgcolor=#fefefe
| 201431 ||  || — || January 27, 2003 || Socorro || LINEAR || — || align=right | 1.3 km || 
|-id=432 bgcolor=#fefefe
| 201432 ||  || — || January 27, 2003 || Socorro || LINEAR || — || align=right data-sort-value="0.83" | 830 m || 
|-id=433 bgcolor=#fefefe
| 201433 ||  || — || January 27, 2003 || Socorro || LINEAR || — || align=right | 1.2 km || 
|-id=434 bgcolor=#fefefe
| 201434 ||  || — || January 28, 2003 || Haleakala || NEAT || — || align=right | 1.3 km || 
|-id=435 bgcolor=#fefefe
| 201435 ||  || — || January 28, 2003 || Kitt Peak || Spacewatch || — || align=right data-sort-value="0.87" | 870 m || 
|-id=436 bgcolor=#fefefe
| 201436 ||  || — || February 21, 2003 || Palomar || NEAT || NYS || align=right data-sort-value="0.97" | 970 m || 
|-id=437 bgcolor=#fefefe
| 201437 ||  || — || February 22, 2003 || Palomar || NEAT || — || align=right | 1.1 km || 
|-id=438 bgcolor=#fefefe
| 201438 ||  || — || March 6, 2003 || Anderson Mesa || LONEOS || V || align=right | 1.0 km || 
|-id=439 bgcolor=#fefefe
| 201439 ||  || — || March 6, 2003 || Socorro || LINEAR || — || align=right | 1.2 km || 
|-id=440 bgcolor=#fefefe
| 201440 ||  || — || March 6, 2003 || Anderson Mesa || LONEOS || — || align=right | 1.6 km || 
|-id=441 bgcolor=#fefefe
| 201441 ||  || — || March 6, 2003 || Anderson Mesa || LONEOS || — || align=right | 1.9 km || 
|-id=442 bgcolor=#fefefe
| 201442 ||  || — || March 7, 2003 || Socorro || LINEAR || — || align=right | 1.5 km || 
|-id=443 bgcolor=#fefefe
| 201443 ||  || — || March 7, 2003 || Socorro || LINEAR || — || align=right | 1.6 km || 
|-id=444 bgcolor=#fefefe
| 201444 ||  || — || March 7, 2003 || Socorro || LINEAR || — || align=right data-sort-value="0.89" | 890 m || 
|-id=445 bgcolor=#fefefe
| 201445 ||  || — || March 23, 2003 || Catalina || CSS || FLO || align=right data-sort-value="0.93" | 930 m || 
|-id=446 bgcolor=#fefefe
| 201446 ||  || — || March 24, 2003 || Kitt Peak || Spacewatch || — || align=right data-sort-value="0.99" | 990 m || 
|-id=447 bgcolor=#fefefe
| 201447 ||  || — || March 25, 2003 || Palomar || NEAT || FLO || align=right data-sort-value="0.91" | 910 m || 
|-id=448 bgcolor=#fefefe
| 201448 ||  || — || March 25, 2003 || Haleakala || NEAT || — || align=right | 1.2 km || 
|-id=449 bgcolor=#fefefe
| 201449 ||  || — || March 26, 2003 || Palomar || NEAT || ERI || align=right | 2.3 km || 
|-id=450 bgcolor=#fefefe
| 201450 ||  || — || March 26, 2003 || Palomar || NEAT || — || align=right | 1.0 km || 
|-id=451 bgcolor=#fefefe
| 201451 ||  || — || March 26, 2003 || Palomar || NEAT || — || align=right | 1.2 km || 
|-id=452 bgcolor=#fefefe
| 201452 ||  || — || March 26, 2003 || Palomar || NEAT || FLO || align=right | 1.1 km || 
|-id=453 bgcolor=#fefefe
| 201453 ||  || — || March 26, 2003 || Haleakala || NEAT || — || align=right | 2.4 km || 
|-id=454 bgcolor=#fefefe
| 201454 ||  || — || March 26, 2003 || Haleakala || NEAT || — || align=right | 1.8 km || 
|-id=455 bgcolor=#fefefe
| 201455 ||  || — || March 27, 2003 || Kitt Peak || Spacewatch || ERI || align=right | 3.0 km || 
|-id=456 bgcolor=#FA8072
| 201456 ||  || — || March 27, 2003 || Palomar || NEAT || — || align=right | 1.5 km || 
|-id=457 bgcolor=#fefefe
| 201457 ||  || — || March 29, 2003 || Anderson Mesa || LONEOS || NYS || align=right data-sort-value="0.96" | 960 m || 
|-id=458 bgcolor=#fefefe
| 201458 ||  || — || March 30, 2003 || Kitt Peak || Spacewatch || — || align=right data-sort-value="0.75" | 750 m || 
|-id=459 bgcolor=#fefefe
| 201459 ||  || — || March 30, 2003 || Kitt Peak || Spacewatch || — || align=right | 1.3 km || 
|-id=460 bgcolor=#fefefe
| 201460 ||  || — || March 30, 2003 || Socorro || LINEAR || NYS || align=right | 2.6 km || 
|-id=461 bgcolor=#fefefe
| 201461 ||  || — || March 31, 2003 || Anderson Mesa || LONEOS || NYS || align=right | 1.5 km || 
|-id=462 bgcolor=#fefefe
| 201462 ||  || — || March 24, 2003 || Kitt Peak || Spacewatch || V || align=right | 1.1 km || 
|-id=463 bgcolor=#fefefe
| 201463 ||  || — || March 31, 2003 || Kitt Peak || Spacewatch || — || align=right | 1.6 km || 
|-id=464 bgcolor=#fefefe
| 201464 ||  || — || March 31, 2003 || Socorro || LINEAR || FLO || align=right data-sort-value="0.98" | 980 m || 
|-id=465 bgcolor=#fefefe
| 201465 ||  || — || March 26, 2003 || Anderson Mesa || LONEOS || — || align=right data-sort-value="0.95" | 950 m || 
|-id=466 bgcolor=#fefefe
| 201466 ||  || — || March 23, 2003 || Kitt Peak || Spacewatch || — || align=right | 2.1 km || 
|-id=467 bgcolor=#fefefe
| 201467 ||  || — || March 25, 2003 || Anderson Mesa || LONEOS || — || align=right | 1.3 km || 
|-id=468 bgcolor=#E9E9E9
| 201468 ||  || — || March 24, 2003 || Kitt Peak || Spacewatch || JUN || align=right | 1.1 km || 
|-id=469 bgcolor=#fefefe
| 201469 ||  || — || April 1, 2003 || Socorro || LINEAR || NYS || align=right | 1.1 km || 
|-id=470 bgcolor=#fefefe
| 201470 ||  || — || April 3, 2003 || Anderson Mesa || LONEOS || NYS || align=right | 1.6 km || 
|-id=471 bgcolor=#fefefe
| 201471 ||  || — || April 4, 2003 || Kitt Peak || Spacewatch || NYS || align=right data-sort-value="0.69" | 690 m || 
|-id=472 bgcolor=#fefefe
| 201472 ||  || — || April 5, 2003 || Kitt Peak || Spacewatch || NYS || align=right | 1.0 km || 
|-id=473 bgcolor=#fefefe
| 201473 ||  || — || April 3, 2003 || Anderson Mesa || LONEOS || NYS || align=right | 1.0 km || 
|-id=474 bgcolor=#fefefe
| 201474 ||  || — || April 7, 2003 || Kitt Peak || Spacewatch || — || align=right | 1.1 km || 
|-id=475 bgcolor=#fefefe
| 201475 ||  || — || April 4, 2003 || Anderson Mesa || LONEOS || — || align=right | 1.1 km || 
|-id=476 bgcolor=#fefefe
| 201476 ||  || — || April 7, 2003 || Kitt Peak || Spacewatch || — || align=right | 1.1 km || 
|-id=477 bgcolor=#fefefe
| 201477 ||  || — || April 7, 2003 || Socorro || LINEAR || NYS || align=right | 2.9 km || 
|-id=478 bgcolor=#fefefe
| 201478 ||  || — || April 7, 2003 || Palomar || NEAT || V || align=right data-sort-value="0.87" | 870 m || 
|-id=479 bgcolor=#fefefe
| 201479 ||  || — || April 10, 2003 || Kitt Peak || Spacewatch || — || align=right | 1.6 km || 
|-id=480 bgcolor=#fefefe
| 201480 ||  || — || April 4, 2003 || Kitt Peak || Spacewatch || V || align=right | 1.2 km || 
|-id=481 bgcolor=#fefefe
| 201481 ||  || — || April 21, 2003 || Catalina || CSS || NYS || align=right | 1.3 km || 
|-id=482 bgcolor=#fefefe
| 201482 ||  || — || April 24, 2003 || Kitt Peak || Spacewatch || — || align=right | 1.2 km || 
|-id=483 bgcolor=#fefefe
| 201483 ||  || — || April 24, 2003 || Anderson Mesa || LONEOS || MAS || align=right | 1.0 km || 
|-id=484 bgcolor=#fefefe
| 201484 ||  || — || April 24, 2003 || Anderson Mesa || LONEOS || V || align=right | 1.1 km || 
|-id=485 bgcolor=#fefefe
| 201485 ||  || — || April 26, 2003 || Haleakala || NEAT || FLO || align=right | 1.1 km || 
|-id=486 bgcolor=#fefefe
| 201486 ||  || — || April 27, 2003 || Anderson Mesa || LONEOS || NYS || align=right | 2.4 km || 
|-id=487 bgcolor=#E9E9E9
| 201487 ||  || — || April 27, 2003 || Anderson Mesa || LONEOS || RAF || align=right | 1.3 km || 
|-id=488 bgcolor=#fefefe
| 201488 ||  || — || April 29, 2003 || Socorro || LINEAR || NYS || align=right data-sort-value="0.91" | 910 m || 
|-id=489 bgcolor=#E9E9E9
| 201489 ||  || — || April 29, 2003 || Socorro || LINEAR || — || align=right | 1.3 km || 
|-id=490 bgcolor=#E9E9E9
| 201490 ||  || — || April 30, 2003 || Haleakala || NEAT || — || align=right | 2.6 km || 
|-id=491 bgcolor=#fefefe
| 201491 ||  || — || April 30, 2003 || Reedy Creek || J. Broughton || — || align=right | 1.3 km || 
|-id=492 bgcolor=#fefefe
| 201492 ||  || — || April 24, 2003 || Kitt Peak || Spacewatch || NYS || align=right | 1.1 km || 
|-id=493 bgcolor=#fefefe
| 201493 ||  || — || May 1, 2003 || Socorro || LINEAR || NYS || align=right | 1.2 km || 
|-id=494 bgcolor=#fefefe
| 201494 ||  || — || May 1, 2003 || Socorro || LINEAR || NYS || align=right | 1.1 km || 
|-id=495 bgcolor=#d6d6d6
| 201495 ||  || — || May 2, 2003 || Kitt Peak || Spacewatch || HYG || align=right | 4.0 km || 
|-id=496 bgcolor=#fefefe
| 201496 ||  || — || May 1, 2003 || Kitt Peak || Spacewatch || NYS || align=right data-sort-value="0.91" | 910 m || 
|-id=497 bgcolor=#E9E9E9
| 201497 Marcelroche ||  ||  || May 2, 2003 || Mérida || I. R. Ferrín, C. Leal || MIT || align=right | 4.5 km || 
|-id=498 bgcolor=#fefefe
| 201498 ||  || — || May 25, 2003 || Reedy Creek || J. Broughton || — || align=right | 2.3 km || 
|-id=499 bgcolor=#fefefe
| 201499 ||  || — || May 26, 2003 || Reedy Creek || J. Broughton || — || align=right | 1.3 km || 
|-id=500 bgcolor=#E9E9E9
| 201500 ||  || — || June 2, 2003 || Siding Spring || R. H. McNaught || — || align=right | 3.9 km || 
|}

201501–201600 

|-bgcolor=#E9E9E9
| 201501 ||  || — || June 5, 2003 || Kitt Peak || Spacewatch || — || align=right | 3.3 km || 
|-id=502 bgcolor=#E9E9E9
| 201502 ||  || — || June 25, 2003 || Socorro || LINEAR || — || align=right | 2.1 km || 
|-id=503 bgcolor=#E9E9E9
| 201503 ||  || — || June 26, 2003 || Socorro || LINEAR || — || align=right | 5.9 km || 
|-id=504 bgcolor=#E9E9E9
| 201504 ||  || — || June 28, 2003 || Reedy Creek || J. Broughton || — || align=right | 1.9 km || 
|-id=505 bgcolor=#E9E9E9
| 201505 ||  || — || June 26, 2003 || Socorro || LINEAR || — || align=right | 4.0 km || 
|-id=506 bgcolor=#E9E9E9
| 201506 || 2003 NQ || — || July 1, 2003 || Haleakala || NEAT || — || align=right | 1.5 km || 
|-id=507 bgcolor=#E9E9E9
| 201507 ||  || — || July 8, 2003 || Palomar || NEAT || — || align=right | 3.2 km || 
|-id=508 bgcolor=#E9E9E9
| 201508 ||  || — || July 22, 2003 || Socorro || LINEAR || — || align=right | 8.5 km || 
|-id=509 bgcolor=#E9E9E9
| 201509 ||  || — || July 23, 2003 || Haleakala || NEAT || EUN || align=right | 2.3 km || 
|-id=510 bgcolor=#E9E9E9
| 201510 ||  || — || July 24, 2003 || Reedy Creek || J. Broughton || — || align=right | 5.0 km || 
|-id=511 bgcolor=#E9E9E9
| 201511 ||  || — || July 24, 2003 || Mallorca || OAM Obs. || — || align=right | 2.0 km || 
|-id=512 bgcolor=#E9E9E9
| 201512 ||  || — || July 23, 2003 || Palomar || NEAT || MAR || align=right | 1.3 km || 
|-id=513 bgcolor=#E9E9E9
| 201513 ||  || — || July 23, 2003 || Palomar || NEAT || ADE || align=right | 4.3 km || 
|-id=514 bgcolor=#E9E9E9
| 201514 ||  || — || July 31, 2003 || Haleakala || NEAT || — || align=right | 4.3 km || 
|-id=515 bgcolor=#E9E9E9
| 201515 ||  || — || July 28, 2003 || Campo Imperatore || CINEOS || — || align=right | 1.9 km || 
|-id=516 bgcolor=#E9E9E9
| 201516 ||  || — || July 24, 2003 || Palomar || NEAT || — || align=right | 4.1 km || 
|-id=517 bgcolor=#E9E9E9
| 201517 ||  || — || July 24, 2003 || Palomar || NEAT || — || align=right | 1.4 km || 
|-id=518 bgcolor=#E9E9E9
| 201518 ||  || — || July 24, 2003 || Palomar || NEAT || — || align=right | 1.8 km || 
|-id=519 bgcolor=#fefefe
| 201519 ||  || — || July 24, 2003 || Campo Imperatore || CINEOS || V || align=right | 1.1 km || 
|-id=520 bgcolor=#E9E9E9
| 201520 ||  || — || August 2, 2003 || Haleakala || NEAT || — || align=right | 2.0 km || 
|-id=521 bgcolor=#d6d6d6
| 201521 ||  || — || August 19, 2003 || Campo Imperatore || CINEOS || KOR || align=right | 2.5 km || 
|-id=522 bgcolor=#E9E9E9
| 201522 ||  || — || August 19, 2003 || Campo Imperatore || CINEOS || — || align=right | 1.8 km || 
|-id=523 bgcolor=#E9E9E9
| 201523 ||  || — || August 20, 2003 || Campo Imperatore || CINEOS || MRX || align=right | 1.5 km || 
|-id=524 bgcolor=#fefefe
| 201524 ||  || — || August 21, 2003 || Palomar || NEAT || — || align=right | 1.7 km || 
|-id=525 bgcolor=#fefefe
| 201525 ||  || — || August 22, 2003 || Haleakala || NEAT || — || align=right | 1.5 km || 
|-id=526 bgcolor=#E9E9E9
| 201526 ||  || — || August 22, 2003 || Palomar || NEAT || GEF || align=right | 2.2 km || 
|-id=527 bgcolor=#E9E9E9
| 201527 ||  || — || August 22, 2003 || Palomar || NEAT || — || align=right | 3.1 km || 
|-id=528 bgcolor=#E9E9E9
| 201528 ||  || — || August 22, 2003 || Palomar || NEAT || — || align=right | 2.9 km || 
|-id=529 bgcolor=#E9E9E9
| 201529 ||  || — || August 22, 2003 || Campo Imperatore || CINEOS || — || align=right | 2.7 km || 
|-id=530 bgcolor=#E9E9E9
| 201530 ||  || — || August 22, 2003 || Palomar || NEAT || — || align=right | 1.5 km || 
|-id=531 bgcolor=#E9E9E9
| 201531 ||  || — || August 22, 2003 || Palomar || NEAT || — || align=right | 5.4 km || 
|-id=532 bgcolor=#E9E9E9
| 201532 ||  || — || August 22, 2003 || Palomar || NEAT || — || align=right | 2.2 km || 
|-id=533 bgcolor=#E9E9E9
| 201533 ||  || — || August 22, 2003 || Palomar || NEAT || — || align=right | 3.3 km || 
|-id=534 bgcolor=#E9E9E9
| 201534 ||  || — || August 23, 2003 || Socorro || LINEAR || GEF || align=right | 2.3 km || 
|-id=535 bgcolor=#d6d6d6
| 201535 ||  || — || August 23, 2003 || Socorro || LINEAR || — || align=right | 3.5 km || 
|-id=536 bgcolor=#E9E9E9
| 201536 ||  || — || August 23, 2003 || Socorro || LINEAR || — || align=right | 4.0 km || 
|-id=537 bgcolor=#E9E9E9
| 201537 ||  || — || August 23, 2003 || Palomar || NEAT || PAD || align=right | 3.8 km || 
|-id=538 bgcolor=#d6d6d6
| 201538 ||  || — || August 24, 2003 || Socorro || LINEAR || — || align=right | 3.7 km || 
|-id=539 bgcolor=#E9E9E9
| 201539 ||  || — || August 24, 2003 || Socorro || LINEAR || NEM || align=right | 3.2 km || 
|-id=540 bgcolor=#E9E9E9
| 201540 ||  || — || August 24, 2003 || Socorro || LINEAR || — || align=right | 1.6 km || 
|-id=541 bgcolor=#E9E9E9
| 201541 ||  || — || August 29, 2003 || Haleakala || NEAT || — || align=right | 4.2 km || 
|-id=542 bgcolor=#E9E9E9
| 201542 ||  || — || August 30, 2003 || Haleakala || NEAT || — || align=right | 4.9 km || 
|-id=543 bgcolor=#E9E9E9
| 201543 ||  || — || August 28, 2003 || Haleakala || NEAT || — || align=right | 2.4 km || 
|-id=544 bgcolor=#E9E9E9
| 201544 ||  || — || August 28, 2003 || Haleakala || NEAT || WIT || align=right | 1.6 km || 
|-id=545 bgcolor=#E9E9E9
| 201545 ||  || — || August 31, 2003 || Socorro || LINEAR || — || align=right | 4.0 km || 
|-id=546 bgcolor=#E9E9E9
| 201546 ||  || — || August 31, 2003 || Haleakala || NEAT || — || align=right | 2.6 km || 
|-id=547 bgcolor=#E9E9E9
| 201547 ||  || — || August 31, 2003 || Kitt Peak || Spacewatch || — || align=right | 2.0 km || 
|-id=548 bgcolor=#E9E9E9
| 201548 ||  || — || August 31, 2003 || Socorro || LINEAR || — || align=right | 1.6 km || 
|-id=549 bgcolor=#E9E9E9
| 201549 || 2003 RN || — || September 1, 2003 || Kvistaberg || UDAS || GER || align=right | 3.5 km || 
|-id=550 bgcolor=#E9E9E9
| 201550 ||  || — || September 15, 2003 || Palomar || NEAT || — || align=right | 1.5 km || 
|-id=551 bgcolor=#d6d6d6
| 201551 ||  || — || September 15, 2003 || Haleakala || NEAT || — || align=right | 7.0 km || 
|-id=552 bgcolor=#E9E9E9
| 201552 ||  || — || September 15, 2003 || Palomar || NEAT || — || align=right | 3.2 km || 
|-id=553 bgcolor=#E9E9E9
| 201553 ||  || — || September 15, 2003 || Palomar || NEAT || — || align=right | 2.8 km || 
|-id=554 bgcolor=#E9E9E9
| 201554 ||  || — || September 15, 2003 || Palomar || NEAT || — || align=right | 3.5 km || 
|-id=555 bgcolor=#E9E9E9
| 201555 ||  || — || September 15, 2003 || Anderson Mesa || LONEOS || WIT || align=right | 1.9 km || 
|-id=556 bgcolor=#E9E9E9
| 201556 ||  || — || September 15, 2003 || Anderson Mesa || LONEOS || XIZ || align=right | 2.6 km || 
|-id=557 bgcolor=#d6d6d6
| 201557 ||  || — || September 3, 2003 || Bergisch Gladbach || W. Bickel || — || align=right | 4.1 km || 
|-id=558 bgcolor=#E9E9E9
| 201558 ||  || — || September 1, 2003 || Socorro || LINEAR || JUN || align=right | 1.7 km || 
|-id=559 bgcolor=#E9E9E9
| 201559 ||  || — || September 16, 2003 || Kitt Peak || Spacewatch || — || align=right | 2.9 km || 
|-id=560 bgcolor=#E9E9E9
| 201560 ||  || — || September 16, 2003 || Kitt Peak || Spacewatch || — || align=right | 2.9 km || 
|-id=561 bgcolor=#E9E9E9
| 201561 ||  || — || September 17, 2003 || Kitt Peak || Spacewatch || NEM || align=right | 2.7 km || 
|-id=562 bgcolor=#E9E9E9
| 201562 ||  || — || September 16, 2003 || Kitt Peak || Spacewatch || — || align=right | 2.0 km || 
|-id=563 bgcolor=#E9E9E9
| 201563 ||  || — || September 17, 2003 || Socorro || LINEAR || — || align=right | 3.4 km || 
|-id=564 bgcolor=#E9E9E9
| 201564 ||  || — || September 17, 2003 || Kitt Peak || Spacewatch || NEM || align=right | 4.2 km || 
|-id=565 bgcolor=#E9E9E9
| 201565 ||  || — || September 18, 2003 || Palomar || NEAT || WIT || align=right | 1.9 km || 
|-id=566 bgcolor=#E9E9E9
| 201566 ||  || — || September 18, 2003 || Palomar || NEAT || — || align=right | 3.6 km || 
|-id=567 bgcolor=#d6d6d6
| 201567 ||  || — || September 18, 2003 || Palomar || NEAT || — || align=right | 3.6 km || 
|-id=568 bgcolor=#E9E9E9
| 201568 ||  || — || September 16, 2003 || Palomar || NEAT || CLO || align=right | 3.7 km || 
|-id=569 bgcolor=#E9E9E9
| 201569 ||  || — || September 17, 2003 || Kvistaberg || UDAS || — || align=right | 3.2 km || 
|-id=570 bgcolor=#E9E9E9
| 201570 ||  || — || September 18, 2003 || Palomar || NEAT || XIZ || align=right | 2.2 km || 
|-id=571 bgcolor=#E9E9E9
| 201571 ||  || — || September 18, 2003 || Palomar || NEAT || WIT || align=right | 1.2 km || 
|-id=572 bgcolor=#E9E9E9
| 201572 ||  || — || September 18, 2003 || Palomar || NEAT || — || align=right | 2.3 km || 
|-id=573 bgcolor=#E9E9E9
| 201573 ||  || — || September 17, 2003 || Anderson Mesa || LONEOS || — || align=right | 3.1 km || 
|-id=574 bgcolor=#E9E9E9
| 201574 ||  || — || September 17, 2003 || Socorro || LINEAR || — || align=right | 2.5 km || 
|-id=575 bgcolor=#E9E9E9
| 201575 ||  || — || September 18, 2003 || Socorro || LINEAR || — || align=right | 3.8 km || 
|-id=576 bgcolor=#E9E9E9
| 201576 ||  || — || September 17, 2003 || Kitt Peak || Spacewatch || — || align=right | 3.3 km || 
|-id=577 bgcolor=#E9E9E9
| 201577 ||  || — || September 18, 2003 || Uccle || T. Pauwels || — || align=right | 3.6 km || 
|-id=578 bgcolor=#E9E9E9
| 201578 ||  || — || September 18, 2003 || Kitt Peak || Spacewatch || DOR || align=right | 4.6 km || 
|-id=579 bgcolor=#E9E9E9
| 201579 ||  || — || September 19, 2003 || Kitt Peak || Spacewatch || — || align=right | 1.4 km || 
|-id=580 bgcolor=#E9E9E9
| 201580 ||  || — || September 19, 2003 || Kitt Peak || Spacewatch || NEM || align=right | 3.0 km || 
|-id=581 bgcolor=#E9E9E9
| 201581 ||  || — || September 19, 2003 || Haleakala || NEAT || — || align=right | 3.3 km || 
|-id=582 bgcolor=#E9E9E9
| 201582 ||  || — || September 16, 2003 || Kitt Peak || Spacewatch || CLO || align=right | 5.0 km || 
|-id=583 bgcolor=#E9E9E9
| 201583 ||  || — || September 17, 2003 || Socorro || LINEAR || — || align=right | 3.9 km || 
|-id=584 bgcolor=#E9E9E9
| 201584 ||  || — || September 17, 2003 || Campo Imperatore || CINEOS || — || align=right | 4.2 km || 
|-id=585 bgcolor=#E9E9E9
| 201585 ||  || — || September 18, 2003 || Socorro || LINEAR || — || align=right | 4.7 km || 
|-id=586 bgcolor=#E9E9E9
| 201586 ||  || — || September 19, 2003 || Palomar || NEAT || — || align=right | 3.9 km || 
|-id=587 bgcolor=#E9E9E9
| 201587 ||  || — || September 20, 2003 || Socorro || LINEAR || HOF || align=right | 4.1 km || 
|-id=588 bgcolor=#E9E9E9
| 201588 ||  || — || September 17, 2003 || Kitt Peak || Spacewatch || — || align=right | 3.7 km || 
|-id=589 bgcolor=#E9E9E9
| 201589 ||  || — || September 17, 2003 || Socorro || LINEAR || — || align=right | 3.8 km || 
|-id=590 bgcolor=#d6d6d6
| 201590 ||  || — || September 20, 2003 || Socorro || LINEAR || EOS || align=right | 2.9 km || 
|-id=591 bgcolor=#E9E9E9
| 201591 ||  || — || September 20, 2003 || Kitt Peak || Spacewatch || WIT || align=right | 1.6 km || 
|-id=592 bgcolor=#E9E9E9
| 201592 ||  || — || September 20, 2003 || Črni Vrh || Črni Vrh || MRX || align=right | 1.7 km || 
|-id=593 bgcolor=#E9E9E9
| 201593 ||  || — || September 18, 2003 || Kitt Peak || Spacewatch || HEN || align=right | 1.8 km || 
|-id=594 bgcolor=#E9E9E9
| 201594 ||  || — || September 21, 2003 || Socorro || LINEAR || HOF || align=right | 4.1 km || 
|-id=595 bgcolor=#E9E9E9
| 201595 ||  || — || September 20, 2003 || Haleakala || NEAT || GEF || align=right | 2.2 km || 
|-id=596 bgcolor=#d6d6d6
| 201596 ||  || — || September 16, 2003 || Kitt Peak || Spacewatch || — || align=right | 3.2 km || 
|-id=597 bgcolor=#E9E9E9
| 201597 ||  || — || September 18, 2003 || Palomar || NEAT || — || align=right | 1.5 km || 
|-id=598 bgcolor=#E9E9E9
| 201598 ||  || — || September 19, 2003 || Anderson Mesa || LONEOS || PAD || align=right | 3.4 km || 
|-id=599 bgcolor=#E9E9E9
| 201599 ||  || — || September 20, 2003 || Anderson Mesa || LONEOS || — || align=right | 3.1 km || 
|-id=600 bgcolor=#E9E9E9
| 201600 ||  || — || September 18, 2003 || Kitt Peak || Spacewatch || — || align=right | 2.1 km || 
|}

201601–201700 

|-bgcolor=#E9E9E9
| 201601 ||  || — || September 18, 2003 || Kitt Peak || Spacewatch || — || align=right | 2.7 km || 
|-id=602 bgcolor=#E9E9E9
| 201602 ||  || — || September 22, 2003 || Anderson Mesa || LONEOS || — || align=right | 3.2 km || 
|-id=603 bgcolor=#d6d6d6
| 201603 ||  || — || September 24, 2003 || Palomar || NEAT || BRA || align=right | 3.8 km || 
|-id=604 bgcolor=#E9E9E9
| 201604 ||  || — || September 20, 2003 || Palomar || NEAT || — || align=right | 3.9 km || 
|-id=605 bgcolor=#E9E9E9
| 201605 ||  || — || September 20, 2003 || Palomar || NEAT || AGN || align=right | 2.0 km || 
|-id=606 bgcolor=#E9E9E9
| 201606 ||  || — || September 20, 2003 || Palomar || NEAT || — || align=right | 2.7 km || 
|-id=607 bgcolor=#d6d6d6
| 201607 ||  || — || September 20, 2003 || Palomar || NEAT || BRA || align=right | 2.4 km || 
|-id=608 bgcolor=#E9E9E9
| 201608 ||  || — || September 21, 2003 || Anderson Mesa || LONEOS || — || align=right | 3.5 km || 
|-id=609 bgcolor=#E9E9E9
| 201609 ||  || — || September 26, 2003 || Desert Eagle || W. K. Y. Yeung || — || align=right | 3.9 km || 
|-id=610 bgcolor=#E9E9E9
| 201610 ||  || — || September 20, 2003 || Campo Imperatore || CINEOS || — || align=right | 3.2 km || 
|-id=611 bgcolor=#E9E9E9
| 201611 ||  || — || September 22, 2003 || Anderson Mesa || LONEOS || — || align=right | 2.5 km || 
|-id=612 bgcolor=#E9E9E9
| 201612 ||  || — || September 22, 2003 || Kitt Peak || Spacewatch || — || align=right | 4.0 km || 
|-id=613 bgcolor=#E9E9E9
| 201613 ||  || — || September 25, 2003 || Haleakala || NEAT || ADE || align=right | 4.3 km || 
|-id=614 bgcolor=#d6d6d6
| 201614 ||  || — || September 27, 2003 || Kitt Peak || Spacewatch || — || align=right | 2.9 km || 
|-id=615 bgcolor=#d6d6d6
| 201615 ||  || — || September 29, 2003 || Desert Eagle || W. K. Y. Yeung || — || align=right | 5.1 km || 
|-id=616 bgcolor=#d6d6d6
| 201616 ||  || — || September 26, 2003 || Socorro || LINEAR || — || align=right | 3.2 km || 
|-id=617 bgcolor=#E9E9E9
| 201617 ||  || — || September 25, 2003 || Palomar || NEAT || — || align=right | 4.9 km || 
|-id=618 bgcolor=#E9E9E9
| 201618 ||  || — || September 25, 2003 || Palomar || NEAT || — || align=right | 1.6 km || 
|-id=619 bgcolor=#E9E9E9
| 201619 ||  || — || September 26, 2003 || Socorro || LINEAR || — || align=right | 3.4 km || 
|-id=620 bgcolor=#d6d6d6
| 201620 ||  || — || September 26, 2003 || Socorro || LINEAR || — || align=right | 4.0 km || 
|-id=621 bgcolor=#d6d6d6
| 201621 ||  || — || September 26, 2003 || Socorro || LINEAR || — || align=right | 6.6 km || 
|-id=622 bgcolor=#E9E9E9
| 201622 ||  || — || September 27, 2003 || Socorro || LINEAR || AER || align=right | 2.3 km || 
|-id=623 bgcolor=#E9E9E9
| 201623 ||  || — || September 27, 2003 || Kitt Peak || Spacewatch || — || align=right | 1.6 km || 
|-id=624 bgcolor=#E9E9E9
| 201624 ||  || — || September 27, 2003 || Socorro || LINEAR || AEO || align=right | 1.8 km || 
|-id=625 bgcolor=#E9E9E9
| 201625 ||  || — || September 28, 2003 || Kitt Peak || Spacewatch || HOF || align=right | 3.5 km || 
|-id=626 bgcolor=#E9E9E9
| 201626 ||  || — || September 28, 2003 || Kitt Peak || Spacewatch || AGN || align=right | 2.0 km || 
|-id=627 bgcolor=#E9E9E9
| 201627 ||  || — || September 28, 2003 || Kitt Peak || Spacewatch || — || align=right | 2.0 km || 
|-id=628 bgcolor=#E9E9E9
| 201628 ||  || — || September 28, 2003 || Socorro || LINEAR || WIT || align=right | 1.5 km || 
|-id=629 bgcolor=#E9E9E9
| 201629 ||  || — || September 28, 2003 || Socorro || LINEAR || AGN || align=right | 1.6 km || 
|-id=630 bgcolor=#E9E9E9
| 201630 ||  || — || September 29, 2003 || Socorro || LINEAR || HOF || align=right | 4.2 km || 
|-id=631 bgcolor=#E9E9E9
| 201631 ||  || — || September 25, 2003 || Haleakala || NEAT || GEF || align=right | 2.4 km || 
|-id=632 bgcolor=#E9E9E9
| 201632 ||  || — || September 30, 2003 || Socorro || LINEAR || — || align=right | 3.4 km || 
|-id=633 bgcolor=#E9E9E9
| 201633 ||  || — || September 18, 2003 || Kitt Peak || Spacewatch || MRX || align=right | 1.4 km || 
|-id=634 bgcolor=#E9E9E9
| 201634 ||  || — || September 20, 2003 || Socorro || LINEAR || — || align=right | 2.9 km || 
|-id=635 bgcolor=#d6d6d6
| 201635 ||  || — || September 20, 2003 || Palomar || NEAT || — || align=right | 3.9 km || 
|-id=636 bgcolor=#E9E9E9
| 201636 ||  || — || September 18, 2003 || Haleakala || NEAT || NEM || align=right | 3.8 km || 
|-id=637 bgcolor=#d6d6d6
| 201637 ||  || — || September 29, 2003 || Anderson Mesa || LONEOS || ALA || align=right | 7.0 km || 
|-id=638 bgcolor=#E9E9E9
| 201638 ||  || — || September 29, 2003 || Socorro || LINEAR || — || align=right | 3.3 km || 
|-id=639 bgcolor=#E9E9E9
| 201639 ||  || — || September 19, 2003 || Palomar || NEAT || — || align=right | 2.6 km || 
|-id=640 bgcolor=#E9E9E9
| 201640 ||  || — || September 18, 2003 || Palomar || NEAT || — || align=right | 2.2 km || 
|-id=641 bgcolor=#E9E9E9
| 201641 ||  || — || September 18, 2003 || Kitt Peak || Spacewatch || — || align=right | 2.1 km || 
|-id=642 bgcolor=#E9E9E9
| 201642 ||  || — || September 22, 2003 || Anderson Mesa || LONEOS || — || align=right | 4.5 km || 
|-id=643 bgcolor=#E9E9E9
| 201643 ||  || — || September 28, 2003 || Apache Point || SDSS || — || align=right | 2.4 km || 
|-id=644 bgcolor=#d6d6d6
| 201644 ||  || — || September 25, 2003 || Palomar || NEAT || — || align=right | 4.6 km || 
|-id=645 bgcolor=#d6d6d6
| 201645 ||  || — || September 22, 2003 || Kitt Peak || Spacewatch || — || align=right | 5.4 km || 
|-id=646 bgcolor=#E9E9E9
| 201646 ||  || — || September 26, 2003 || Apache Point || SDSS || AST || align=right | 2.4 km || 
|-id=647 bgcolor=#d6d6d6
| 201647 ||  || — || September 28, 2003 || Kitt Peak || Spacewatch || KAR || align=right | 1.2 km || 
|-id=648 bgcolor=#E9E9E9
| 201648 ||  || — || September 30, 2003 || Kitt Peak || Spacewatch || — || align=right | 3.0 km || 
|-id=649 bgcolor=#d6d6d6
| 201649 ||  || — || October 5, 2003 || Kitt Peak || Spacewatch || — || align=right | 3.3 km || 
|-id=650 bgcolor=#E9E9E9
| 201650 ||  || — || October 1, 2003 || Kitt Peak || Spacewatch || — || align=right | 3.7 km || 
|-id=651 bgcolor=#E9E9E9
| 201651 ||  || — || October 1, 2003 || Anderson Mesa || LONEOS || — || align=right | 2.8 km || 
|-id=652 bgcolor=#E9E9E9
| 201652 ||  || — || October 1, 2003 || Kitt Peak || Spacewatch || — || align=right | 3.2 km || 
|-id=653 bgcolor=#E9E9E9
| 201653 ||  || — || October 3, 2003 || Haleakala || NEAT || — || align=right | 3.9 km || 
|-id=654 bgcolor=#E9E9E9
| 201654 ||  || — || October 14, 2003 || Palomar || NEAT || — || align=right | 4.3 km || 
|-id=655 bgcolor=#E9E9E9
| 201655 ||  || — || October 15, 2003 || Palomar || NEAT || — || align=right | 3.7 km || 
|-id=656 bgcolor=#E9E9E9
| 201656 ||  || — || October 14, 2003 || Anderson Mesa || LONEOS || INO || align=right | 2.2 km || 
|-id=657 bgcolor=#d6d6d6
| 201657 ||  || — || October 15, 2003 || Anderson Mesa || LONEOS || — || align=right | 7.2 km || 
|-id=658 bgcolor=#E9E9E9
| 201658 ||  || — || October 14, 2003 || Palomar || NEAT || JUN || align=right | 6.6 km || 
|-id=659 bgcolor=#d6d6d6
| 201659 ||  || — || October 1, 2003 || Kitt Peak || Spacewatch || KAR || align=right | 1.4 km || 
|-id=660 bgcolor=#E9E9E9
| 201660 ||  || — || October 3, 2003 || Kitt Peak || Spacewatch || GEF || align=right | 1.6 km || 
|-id=661 bgcolor=#E9E9E9
| 201661 ||  || — || October 16, 2003 || Kitt Peak || Spacewatch || MRX || align=right | 3.4 km || 
|-id=662 bgcolor=#E9E9E9
| 201662 ||  || — || October 17, 2003 || Socorro || LINEAR || — || align=right | 4.4 km || 
|-id=663 bgcolor=#d6d6d6
| 201663 ||  || — || October 19, 2003 || Kitt Peak || Spacewatch || THM || align=right | 3.7 km || 
|-id=664 bgcolor=#E9E9E9
| 201664 ||  || — || October 16, 2003 || Palomar || NEAT || — || align=right | 1.4 km || 
|-id=665 bgcolor=#d6d6d6
| 201665 ||  || — || October 22, 2003 || Kitt Peak || Spacewatch || — || align=right | 3.6 km || 
|-id=666 bgcolor=#d6d6d6
| 201666 ||  || — || October 17, 2003 || Kitt Peak || Spacewatch || — || align=right | 3.4 km || 
|-id=667 bgcolor=#E9E9E9
| 201667 ||  || — || October 18, 2003 || Palomar || NEAT || — || align=right | 4.4 km || 
|-id=668 bgcolor=#E9E9E9
| 201668 ||  || — || October 26, 2003 || Kvistaberg || UDAS || NEM || align=right | 5.3 km || 
|-id=669 bgcolor=#E9E9E9
| 201669 ||  || — || October 16, 2003 || Kitt Peak || Spacewatch || PAD || align=right | 4.0 km || 
|-id=670 bgcolor=#E9E9E9
| 201670 ||  || — || October 16, 2003 || Palomar || NEAT || — || align=right | 5.8 km || 
|-id=671 bgcolor=#d6d6d6
| 201671 ||  || — || October 18, 2003 || Kitt Peak || Spacewatch || EOS || align=right | 2.5 km || 
|-id=672 bgcolor=#E9E9E9
| 201672 ||  || — || October 19, 2003 || Kitt Peak || Spacewatch || AST || align=right | 2.7 km || 
|-id=673 bgcolor=#E9E9E9
| 201673 ||  || — || October 17, 2003 || Anderson Mesa || LONEOS || — || align=right | 4.1 km || 
|-id=674 bgcolor=#E9E9E9
| 201674 ||  || — || October 16, 2003 || Palomar || NEAT || — || align=right | 3.0 km || 
|-id=675 bgcolor=#E9E9E9
| 201675 ||  || — || October 18, 2003 || Kitt Peak || Spacewatch || — || align=right | 3.1 km || 
|-id=676 bgcolor=#E9E9E9
| 201676 ||  || — || October 18, 2003 || Haleakala || NEAT || NEM || align=right | 3.4 km || 
|-id=677 bgcolor=#d6d6d6
| 201677 ||  || — || October 18, 2003 || Palomar || NEAT || EOS || align=right | 3.4 km || 
|-id=678 bgcolor=#E9E9E9
| 201678 ||  || — || October 19, 2003 || Kitt Peak || Spacewatch || AGN || align=right | 2.1 km || 
|-id=679 bgcolor=#E9E9E9
| 201679 ||  || — || October 19, 2003 || Anderson Mesa || LONEOS || — || align=right | 4.3 km || 
|-id=680 bgcolor=#E9E9E9
| 201680 ||  || — || October 20, 2003 || Palomar || NEAT || — || align=right | 3.4 km || 
|-id=681 bgcolor=#E9E9E9
| 201681 ||  || — || October 18, 2003 || Kitt Peak || Spacewatch || PAD || align=right | 3.8 km || 
|-id=682 bgcolor=#E9E9E9
| 201682 ||  || — || October 18, 2003 || Kitt Peak || Spacewatch || WIT || align=right | 1.7 km || 
|-id=683 bgcolor=#d6d6d6
| 201683 ||  || — || October 19, 2003 || Kitt Peak || Spacewatch || HYG || align=right | 4.4 km || 
|-id=684 bgcolor=#E9E9E9
| 201684 ||  || — || October 17, 2003 || Anderson Mesa || LONEOS || — || align=right | 2.9 km || 
|-id=685 bgcolor=#d6d6d6
| 201685 ||  || — || October 19, 2003 || Socorro || LINEAR || TIR || align=right | 4.2 km || 
|-id=686 bgcolor=#E9E9E9
| 201686 ||  || — || October 19, 2003 || Kitt Peak || Spacewatch || AGN || align=right | 2.0 km || 
|-id=687 bgcolor=#E9E9E9
| 201687 ||  || — || October 19, 2003 || Kitt Peak || Spacewatch || — || align=right | 2.5 km || 
|-id=688 bgcolor=#E9E9E9
| 201688 ||  || — || October 20, 2003 || Socorro || LINEAR || — || align=right | 3.7 km || 
|-id=689 bgcolor=#E9E9E9
| 201689 ||  || — || October 21, 2003 || Socorro || LINEAR || — || align=right | 3.9 km || 
|-id=690 bgcolor=#d6d6d6
| 201690 ||  || — || October 18, 2003 || Kitt Peak || Spacewatch || — || align=right | 5.5 km || 
|-id=691 bgcolor=#d6d6d6
| 201691 ||  || — || October 18, 2003 || Kitt Peak || Spacewatch || — || align=right | 2.8 km || 
|-id=692 bgcolor=#E9E9E9
| 201692 ||  || — || October 18, 2003 || Kitt Peak || Spacewatch || — || align=right | 3.7 km || 
|-id=693 bgcolor=#E9E9E9
| 201693 ||  || — || October 20, 2003 || Palomar || NEAT || — || align=right | 1.8 km || 
|-id=694 bgcolor=#E9E9E9
| 201694 ||  || — || October 21, 2003 || Kitt Peak || Spacewatch || — || align=right | 2.8 km || 
|-id=695 bgcolor=#E9E9E9
| 201695 ||  || — || October 19, 2003 || Palomar || NEAT || — || align=right | 3.7 km || 
|-id=696 bgcolor=#d6d6d6
| 201696 ||  || — || October 19, 2003 || Palomar || NEAT || — || align=right | 3.2 km || 
|-id=697 bgcolor=#d6d6d6
| 201697 ||  || — || October 19, 2003 || Palomar || NEAT || TEL || align=right | 2.5 km || 
|-id=698 bgcolor=#d6d6d6
| 201698 ||  || — || October 19, 2003 || Palomar || NEAT || YAK || align=right | 3.3 km || 
|-id=699 bgcolor=#d6d6d6
| 201699 ||  || — || October 20, 2003 || Palomar || NEAT || — || align=right | 4.2 km || 
|-id=700 bgcolor=#d6d6d6
| 201700 ||  || — || October 21, 2003 || Palomar || NEAT || — || align=right | 3.9 km || 
|}

201701–201800 

|-bgcolor=#E9E9E9
| 201701 ||  || — || October 16, 2003 || Palomar || NEAT || — || align=right | 3.7 km || 
|-id=702 bgcolor=#d6d6d6
| 201702 ||  || — || October 16, 2003 || Palomar || NEAT || EUP || align=right | 7.4 km || 
|-id=703 bgcolor=#E9E9E9
| 201703 ||  || — || October 16, 2003 || Palomar || NEAT || GEF || align=right | 2.4 km || 
|-id=704 bgcolor=#E9E9E9
| 201704 ||  || — || October 20, 2003 || Socorro || LINEAR || — || align=right | 2.2 km || 
|-id=705 bgcolor=#E9E9E9
| 201705 ||  || — || October 20, 2003 || Kitt Peak || Spacewatch || — || align=right | 1.9 km || 
|-id=706 bgcolor=#E9E9E9
| 201706 ||  || — || October 21, 2003 || Socorro || LINEAR || — || align=right | 3.7 km || 
|-id=707 bgcolor=#d6d6d6
| 201707 ||  || — || October 21, 2003 || Socorro || LINEAR || — || align=right | 5.5 km || 
|-id=708 bgcolor=#d6d6d6
| 201708 ||  || — || October 21, 2003 || Socorro || LINEAR || 628 || align=right | 3.4 km || 
|-id=709 bgcolor=#E9E9E9
| 201709 ||  || — || October 21, 2003 || Socorro || LINEAR || — || align=right | 2.9 km || 
|-id=710 bgcolor=#E9E9E9
| 201710 ||  || — || October 22, 2003 || Socorro || LINEAR || slow || align=right | 3.4 km || 
|-id=711 bgcolor=#d6d6d6
| 201711 ||  || — || October 22, 2003 || Socorro || LINEAR || — || align=right | 3.7 km || 
|-id=712 bgcolor=#d6d6d6
| 201712 ||  || — || October 20, 2003 || Socorro || LINEAR || — || align=right | 3.5 km || 
|-id=713 bgcolor=#E9E9E9
| 201713 ||  || — || October 21, 2003 || Anderson Mesa || LONEOS || — || align=right | 2.7 km || 
|-id=714 bgcolor=#d6d6d6
| 201714 ||  || — || October 21, 2003 || Palomar || NEAT || — || align=right | 3.3 km || 
|-id=715 bgcolor=#E9E9E9
| 201715 ||  || — || October 21, 2003 || Socorro || LINEAR || AGN || align=right | 2.1 km || 
|-id=716 bgcolor=#d6d6d6
| 201716 ||  || — || October 21, 2003 || Kitt Peak || Spacewatch || — || align=right | 4.0 km || 
|-id=717 bgcolor=#d6d6d6
| 201717 ||  || — || October 21, 2003 || Palomar || NEAT || KAR || align=right | 1.8 km || 
|-id=718 bgcolor=#E9E9E9
| 201718 ||  || — || October 22, 2003 || Socorro || LINEAR || HOF || align=right | 3.6 km || 
|-id=719 bgcolor=#E9E9E9
| 201719 ||  || — || October 22, 2003 || Kitt Peak || Spacewatch || — || align=right | 3.2 km || 
|-id=720 bgcolor=#d6d6d6
| 201720 ||  || — || October 22, 2003 || Kitt Peak || Spacewatch || — || align=right | 3.5 km || 
|-id=721 bgcolor=#E9E9E9
| 201721 ||  || — || October 22, 2003 || Kitt Peak || Spacewatch || — || align=right | 3.9 km || 
|-id=722 bgcolor=#d6d6d6
| 201722 ||  || — || October 22, 2003 || Kitt Peak || Spacewatch || — || align=right | 2.8 km || 
|-id=723 bgcolor=#E9E9E9
| 201723 ||  || — || October 23, 2003 || Anderson Mesa || LONEOS || NEM || align=right | 3.8 km || 
|-id=724 bgcolor=#d6d6d6
| 201724 ||  || — || October 20, 2003 || Socorro || LINEAR || HYG || align=right | 5.2 km || 
|-id=725 bgcolor=#E9E9E9
| 201725 ||  || — || October 20, 2003 || Socorro || LINEAR || — || align=right | 3.4 km || 
|-id=726 bgcolor=#d6d6d6
| 201726 ||  || — || October 20, 2003 || Kitt Peak || Spacewatch || CHA || align=right | 3.6 km || 
|-id=727 bgcolor=#d6d6d6
| 201727 ||  || — || October 20, 2003 || Kitt Peak || Spacewatch || — || align=right | 3.7 km || 
|-id=728 bgcolor=#d6d6d6
| 201728 ||  || — || October 21, 2003 || Socorro || LINEAR || — || align=right | 4.3 km || 
|-id=729 bgcolor=#d6d6d6
| 201729 ||  || — || October 21, 2003 || Kitt Peak || Spacewatch || HYG || align=right | 3.3 km || 
|-id=730 bgcolor=#E9E9E9
| 201730 ||  || — || October 22, 2003 || Kitt Peak || Spacewatch || — || align=right | 3.5 km || 
|-id=731 bgcolor=#E9E9E9
| 201731 ||  || — || October 22, 2003 || Kitt Peak || Spacewatch || AGN || align=right | 1.7 km || 
|-id=732 bgcolor=#E9E9E9
| 201732 ||  || — || October 23, 2003 || Anderson Mesa || LONEOS || — || align=right | 3.9 km || 
|-id=733 bgcolor=#E9E9E9
| 201733 ||  || — || October 25, 2003 || Kitt Peak || Spacewatch || — || align=right | 3.1 km || 
|-id=734 bgcolor=#d6d6d6
| 201734 ||  || — || October 25, 2003 || Socorro || LINEAR || — || align=right | 4.1 km || 
|-id=735 bgcolor=#E9E9E9
| 201735 ||  || — || October 26, 2003 || Catalina || CSS || — || align=right | 3.7 km || 
|-id=736 bgcolor=#E9E9E9
| 201736 ||  || — || October 25, 2003 || Kitt Peak || Spacewatch || — || align=right | 3.3 km || 
|-id=737 bgcolor=#E9E9E9
| 201737 ||  || — || October 25, 2003 || Kitt Peak || Spacewatch || CLO || align=right | 4.5 km || 
|-id=738 bgcolor=#d6d6d6
| 201738 ||  || — || October 26, 2003 || Haleakala || NEAT || — || align=right | 5.5 km || 
|-id=739 bgcolor=#E9E9E9
| 201739 ||  || — || October 27, 2003 || Socorro || LINEAR || — || align=right | 2.7 km || 
|-id=740 bgcolor=#d6d6d6
| 201740 ||  || — || October 27, 2003 || Socorro || LINEAR || TEL || align=right | 2.8 km || 
|-id=741 bgcolor=#E9E9E9
| 201741 ||  || — || October 27, 2003 || Socorro || LINEAR || — || align=right | 1.5 km || 
|-id=742 bgcolor=#E9E9E9
| 201742 ||  || — || October 27, 2003 || Socorro || LINEAR || MRX || align=right | 1.6 km || 
|-id=743 bgcolor=#E9E9E9
| 201743 ||  || — || October 28, 2003 || Socorro || LINEAR || — || align=right | 2.9 km || 
|-id=744 bgcolor=#E9E9E9
| 201744 ||  || — || October 28, 2003 || Socorro || LINEAR || — || align=right | 4.0 km || 
|-id=745 bgcolor=#E9E9E9
| 201745 ||  || — || October 28, 2003 || Socorro || LINEAR || HOF || align=right | 4.0 km || 
|-id=746 bgcolor=#d6d6d6
| 201746 ||  || — || October 29, 2003 || Haleakala || NEAT || slow || align=right | 5.2 km || 
|-id=747 bgcolor=#E9E9E9
| 201747 ||  || — || October 27, 2003 || Socorro || LINEAR || — || align=right | 4.4 km || 
|-id=748 bgcolor=#d6d6d6
| 201748 ||  || — || October 18, 2003 || Socorro || LINEAR || EUP || align=right | 5.0 km || 
|-id=749 bgcolor=#E9E9E9
| 201749 ||  || — || October 16, 2003 || Kitt Peak || Spacewatch || HNA || align=right | 3.9 km || 
|-id=750 bgcolor=#d6d6d6
| 201750 ||  || — || October 18, 2003 || Kitt Peak || Spacewatch || — || align=right | 3.1 km || 
|-id=751 bgcolor=#E9E9E9
| 201751 Steinhardt ||  ||  || October 23, 2003 || Apache Point || SDSS || — || align=right | 3.2 km || 
|-id=752 bgcolor=#E9E9E9
| 201752 ||  || — || October 16, 2003 || Kitt Peak || Spacewatch || — || align=right | 1.8 km || 
|-id=753 bgcolor=#d6d6d6
| 201753 ||  || — || October 18, 2003 || Kitt Peak || Spacewatch || KOR || align=right | 2.1 km || 
|-id=754 bgcolor=#E9E9E9
| 201754 ||  || — || October 19, 2003 || Kitt Peak || Spacewatch || — || align=right | 1.8 km || 
|-id=755 bgcolor=#d6d6d6
| 201755 ||  || — || October 22, 2003 || Apache Point || SDSS || — || align=right | 3.3 km || 
|-id=756 bgcolor=#E9E9E9
| 201756 ||  || — || November 15, 2003 || Kitt Peak || Spacewatch || — || align=right | 2.9 km || 
|-id=757 bgcolor=#E9E9E9
| 201757 ||  || — || November 18, 2003 || Palomar || NEAT || — || align=right | 4.1 km || 
|-id=758 bgcolor=#E9E9E9
| 201758 ||  || — || November 21, 2003 || Nogales || M. Schwartz, P. R. Holvorcem || — || align=right | 3.5 km || 
|-id=759 bgcolor=#d6d6d6
| 201759 ||  || — || November 18, 2003 || Palomar || NEAT || EOS || align=right | 3.2 km || 
|-id=760 bgcolor=#d6d6d6
| 201760 ||  || — || November 19, 2003 || Kitt Peak || Spacewatch || — || align=right | 3.5 km || 
|-id=761 bgcolor=#d6d6d6
| 201761 ||  || — || November 19, 2003 || Socorro || LINEAR || — || align=right | 3.5 km || 
|-id=762 bgcolor=#d6d6d6
| 201762 ||  || — || November 19, 2003 || Socorro || LINEAR || EOS || align=right | 3.4 km || 
|-id=763 bgcolor=#d6d6d6
| 201763 ||  || — || November 19, 2003 || Socorro || LINEAR || — || align=right | 5.0 km || 
|-id=764 bgcolor=#d6d6d6
| 201764 ||  || — || November 19, 2003 || Socorro || LINEAR || — || align=right | 5.5 km || 
|-id=765 bgcolor=#E9E9E9
| 201765 ||  || — || November 16, 2003 || Catalina || CSS || GEF || align=right | 2.4 km || 
|-id=766 bgcolor=#d6d6d6
| 201766 ||  || — || November 19, 2003 || Palomar || NEAT || — || align=right | 4.7 km || 
|-id=767 bgcolor=#E9E9E9
| 201767 ||  || — || November 19, 2003 || Palomar || NEAT || EUN || align=right | 1.9 km || 
|-id=768 bgcolor=#d6d6d6
| 201768 ||  || — || November 19, 2003 || Kitt Peak || Spacewatch || KOR || align=right | 2.0 km || 
|-id=769 bgcolor=#E9E9E9
| 201769 ||  || — || November 20, 2003 || Palomar || NEAT || — || align=right | 2.2 km || 
|-id=770 bgcolor=#d6d6d6
| 201770 ||  || — || November 20, 2003 || Kitt Peak || Spacewatch || EOS || align=right | 3.5 km || 
|-id=771 bgcolor=#d6d6d6
| 201771 ||  || — || November 19, 2003 || Palomar || NEAT || — || align=right | 4.2 km || 
|-id=772 bgcolor=#d6d6d6
| 201772 ||  || — || November 21, 2003 || Socorro || LINEAR || — || align=right | 3.7 km || 
|-id=773 bgcolor=#E9E9E9
| 201773 ||  || — || November 20, 2003 || Socorro || LINEAR || — || align=right | 3.8 km || 
|-id=774 bgcolor=#d6d6d6
| 201774 ||  || — || November 20, 2003 || Socorro || LINEAR || — || align=right | 6.7 km || 
|-id=775 bgcolor=#E9E9E9
| 201775 ||  || — || November 19, 2003 || Anderson Mesa || LONEOS || AGN || align=right | 1.7 km || 
|-id=776 bgcolor=#E9E9E9
| 201776 ||  || — || November 19, 2003 || Anderson Mesa || LONEOS || AGN || align=right | 2.0 km || 
|-id=777 bgcolor=#d6d6d6
| 201777 Deronda ||  ||  || November 24, 2003 || Wrightwood || J. W. Young || — || align=right | 4.3 km || 
|-id=778 bgcolor=#d6d6d6
| 201778 ||  || — || November 21, 2003 || Socorro || LINEAR || — || align=right | 5.3 km || 
|-id=779 bgcolor=#d6d6d6
| 201779 ||  || — || November 21, 2003 || Socorro || LINEAR || EOS || align=right | 3.3 km || 
|-id=780 bgcolor=#d6d6d6
| 201780 ||  || — || November 21, 2003 || Socorro || LINEAR || — || align=right | 3.6 km || 
|-id=781 bgcolor=#d6d6d6
| 201781 ||  || — || November 22, 2003 || Socorro || LINEAR || — || align=right | 4.9 km || 
|-id=782 bgcolor=#FA8072
| 201782 ||  || — || November 23, 2003 || Catalina || CSS || H || align=right | 1.1 km || 
|-id=783 bgcolor=#E9E9E9
| 201783 ||  || — || November 20, 2003 || Socorro || LINEAR || — || align=right | 3.7 km || 
|-id=784 bgcolor=#d6d6d6
| 201784 ||  || — || November 20, 2003 || Socorro || LINEAR || — || align=right | 4.9 km || 
|-id=785 bgcolor=#d6d6d6
| 201785 ||  || — || November 20, 2003 || Socorro || LINEAR || — || align=right | 5.7 km || 
|-id=786 bgcolor=#d6d6d6
| 201786 ||  || — || November 20, 2003 || Socorro || LINEAR || URS || align=right | 5.6 km || 
|-id=787 bgcolor=#E9E9E9
| 201787 ||  || — || November 19, 2003 || Anderson Mesa || LONEOS || — || align=right | 1.8 km || 
|-id=788 bgcolor=#d6d6d6
| 201788 ||  || — || November 21, 2003 || Socorro || LINEAR || — || align=right | 4.5 km || 
|-id=789 bgcolor=#d6d6d6
| 201789 ||  || — || November 21, 2003 || Socorro || LINEAR || EOS || align=right | 3.3 km || 
|-id=790 bgcolor=#d6d6d6
| 201790 ||  || — || November 21, 2003 || Socorro || LINEAR || — || align=right | 4.4 km || 
|-id=791 bgcolor=#d6d6d6
| 201791 ||  || — || November 21, 2003 || Socorro || LINEAR || — || align=right | 3.6 km || 
|-id=792 bgcolor=#d6d6d6
| 201792 ||  || — || November 21, 2003 || Socorro || LINEAR || — || align=right | 4.9 km || 
|-id=793 bgcolor=#d6d6d6
| 201793 ||  || — || November 21, 2003 || Socorro || LINEAR || — || align=right | 7.6 km || 
|-id=794 bgcolor=#d6d6d6
| 201794 ||  || — || November 21, 2003 || Socorro || LINEAR || — || align=right | 4.1 km || 
|-id=795 bgcolor=#E9E9E9
| 201795 ||  || — || November 21, 2003 || Socorro || LINEAR || HEN || align=right | 1.8 km || 
|-id=796 bgcolor=#d6d6d6
| 201796 ||  || — || November 24, 2003 || Anderson Mesa || LONEOS || — || align=right | 3.8 km || 
|-id=797 bgcolor=#E9E9E9
| 201797 ||  || — || November 26, 2003 || Socorro || LINEAR || — || align=right | 2.8 km || 
|-id=798 bgcolor=#E9E9E9
| 201798 ||  || — || November 30, 2003 || Kitt Peak || Spacewatch || CLO || align=right | 3.2 km || 
|-id=799 bgcolor=#E9E9E9
| 201799 ||  || — || November 19, 2003 || Palomar || NEAT || — || align=right | 4.5 km || 
|-id=800 bgcolor=#d6d6d6
| 201800 ||  || — || November 20, 2003 || Palomar || NEAT || — || align=right | 4.9 km || 
|}

201801–201900 

|-bgcolor=#d6d6d6
| 201801 ||  || — || November 20, 2003 || Socorro || LINEAR || — || align=right | 3.9 km || 
|-id=802 bgcolor=#E9E9E9
| 201802 ||  || — || December 1, 2003 || Socorro || LINEAR || DOR || align=right | 4.5 km || 
|-id=803 bgcolor=#E9E9E9
| 201803 ||  || — || December 1, 2003 || Socorro || LINEAR || NEM || align=right | 3.5 km || 
|-id=804 bgcolor=#d6d6d6
| 201804 ||  || — || December 3, 2003 || Socorro || LINEAR || — || align=right | 5.5 km || 
|-id=805 bgcolor=#d6d6d6
| 201805 ||  || — || December 14, 2003 || Palomar || NEAT || — || align=right | 4.0 km || 
|-id=806 bgcolor=#fefefe
| 201806 ||  || — || December 15, 2003 || Socorro || LINEAR || H || align=right data-sort-value="0.88" | 880 m || 
|-id=807 bgcolor=#E9E9E9
| 201807 ||  || — || December 14, 2003 || Kitt Peak || Spacewatch || — || align=right | 4.8 km || 
|-id=808 bgcolor=#E9E9E9
| 201808 ||  || — || December 14, 2003 || Kitt Peak || Spacewatch || — || align=right | 3.4 km || 
|-id=809 bgcolor=#d6d6d6
| 201809 ||  || — || December 14, 2003 || Kitt Peak || Spacewatch || EUP || align=right | 6.5 km || 
|-id=810 bgcolor=#E9E9E9
| 201810 ||  || — || December 1, 2003 || Socorro || LINEAR || — || align=right | 3.5 km || 
|-id=811 bgcolor=#d6d6d6
| 201811 ||  || — || December 1, 2003 || Kitt Peak || Spacewatch || HYG || align=right | 3.1 km || 
|-id=812 bgcolor=#d6d6d6
| 201812 ||  || — || December 18, 2003 || Nashville || R. Clingan || — || align=right | 3.5 km || 
|-id=813 bgcolor=#d6d6d6
| 201813 ||  || — || December 16, 2003 || Catalina || CSS || — || align=right | 2.9 km || 
|-id=814 bgcolor=#d6d6d6
| 201814 ||  || — || December 17, 2003 || Socorro || LINEAR || — || align=right | 4.4 km || 
|-id=815 bgcolor=#d6d6d6
| 201815 ||  || — || December 17, 2003 || Socorro || LINEAR || — || align=right | 4.4 km || 
|-id=816 bgcolor=#E9E9E9
| 201816 ||  || — || December 17, 2003 || Kitt Peak || Spacewatch || — || align=right | 4.7 km || 
|-id=817 bgcolor=#d6d6d6
| 201817 ||  || — || December 17, 2003 || Kitt Peak || Spacewatch || — || align=right | 3.1 km || 
|-id=818 bgcolor=#d6d6d6
| 201818 ||  || — || December 17, 2003 || Kitt Peak || Spacewatch || KOR || align=right | 2.1 km || 
|-id=819 bgcolor=#d6d6d6
| 201819 ||  || — || December 17, 2003 || Kitt Peak || Spacewatch || — || align=right | 4.7 km || 
|-id=820 bgcolor=#d6d6d6
| 201820 ||  || — || December 18, 2003 || Socorro || LINEAR || — || align=right | 6.5 km || 
|-id=821 bgcolor=#E9E9E9
| 201821 ||  || — || December 18, 2003 || Socorro || LINEAR || — || align=right | 4.6 km || 
|-id=822 bgcolor=#d6d6d6
| 201822 ||  || — || December 18, 2003 || Socorro || LINEAR || — || align=right | 4.0 km || 
|-id=823 bgcolor=#d6d6d6
| 201823 ||  || — || December 16, 2003 || Anderson Mesa || LONEOS || — || align=right | 6.5 km || 
|-id=824 bgcolor=#d6d6d6
| 201824 ||  || — || December 17, 2003 || Kitt Peak || Spacewatch || — || align=right | 4.5 km || 
|-id=825 bgcolor=#d6d6d6
| 201825 ||  || — || December 17, 2003 || Kitt Peak || Spacewatch || — || align=right | 6.3 km || 
|-id=826 bgcolor=#d6d6d6
| 201826 ||  || — || December 17, 2003 || Kitt Peak || Spacewatch || — || align=right | 5.7 km || 
|-id=827 bgcolor=#d6d6d6
| 201827 ||  || — || December 18, 2003 || Socorro || LINEAR || — || align=right | 3.4 km || 
|-id=828 bgcolor=#d6d6d6
| 201828 ||  || — || December 18, 2003 || Socorro || LINEAR || HYG || align=right | 4.6 km || 
|-id=829 bgcolor=#d6d6d6
| 201829 ||  || — || December 18, 2003 || Haleakala || NEAT || — || align=right | 6.0 km || 
|-id=830 bgcolor=#d6d6d6
| 201830 ||  || — || December 18, 2003 || Socorro || LINEAR || — || align=right | 4.2 km || 
|-id=831 bgcolor=#d6d6d6
| 201831 ||  || — || December 19, 2003 || Socorro || LINEAR || KOR || align=right | 2.2 km || 
|-id=832 bgcolor=#E9E9E9
| 201832 ||  || — || December 19, 2003 || Kitt Peak || Spacewatch || — || align=right | 2.8 km || 
|-id=833 bgcolor=#E9E9E9
| 201833 ||  || — || December 19, 2003 || Socorro || LINEAR || AEO || align=right | 2.0 km || 
|-id=834 bgcolor=#E9E9E9
| 201834 ||  || — || December 19, 2003 || Socorro || LINEAR || — || align=right | 4.1 km || 
|-id=835 bgcolor=#d6d6d6
| 201835 ||  || — || December 19, 2003 || Socorro || LINEAR || — || align=right | 3.9 km || 
|-id=836 bgcolor=#d6d6d6
| 201836 ||  || — || December 19, 2003 || Socorro || LINEAR || — || align=right | 4.9 km || 
|-id=837 bgcolor=#d6d6d6
| 201837 ||  || — || December 19, 2003 || Socorro || LINEAR || — || align=right | 4.4 km || 
|-id=838 bgcolor=#d6d6d6
| 201838 ||  || — || December 20, 2003 || Socorro || LINEAR || — || align=right | 7.4 km || 
|-id=839 bgcolor=#d6d6d6
| 201839 ||  || — || December 18, 2003 || Socorro || LINEAR || — || align=right | 3.5 km || 
|-id=840 bgcolor=#d6d6d6
| 201840 ||  || — || December 18, 2003 || Socorro || LINEAR || HYG || align=right | 3.8 km || 
|-id=841 bgcolor=#d6d6d6
| 201841 ||  || — || December 18, 2003 || Socorro || LINEAR || — || align=right | 4.8 km || 
|-id=842 bgcolor=#d6d6d6
| 201842 ||  || — || December 18, 2003 || Socorro || LINEAR || TRP || align=right | 4.0 km || 
|-id=843 bgcolor=#d6d6d6
| 201843 ||  || — || December 18, 2003 || Socorro || LINEAR || — || align=right | 5.9 km || 
|-id=844 bgcolor=#d6d6d6
| 201844 ||  || — || December 18, 2003 || Kitt Peak || Spacewatch || URS || align=right | 4.2 km || 
|-id=845 bgcolor=#d6d6d6
| 201845 ||  || — || December 19, 2003 || Socorro || LINEAR || — || align=right | 5.3 km || 
|-id=846 bgcolor=#d6d6d6
| 201846 ||  || — || December 19, 2003 || Socorro || LINEAR || EOS || align=right | 3.4 km || 
|-id=847 bgcolor=#E9E9E9
| 201847 ||  || — || December 19, 2003 || Socorro || LINEAR || — || align=right | 3.6 km || 
|-id=848 bgcolor=#d6d6d6
| 201848 ||  || — || December 20, 2003 || Socorro || LINEAR || EOS || align=right | 2.8 km || 
|-id=849 bgcolor=#d6d6d6
| 201849 ||  || — || December 20, 2003 || Socorro || LINEAR || — || align=right | 4.4 km || 
|-id=850 bgcolor=#E9E9E9
| 201850 ||  || — || December 21, 2003 || Catalina || CSS || — || align=right | 3.0 km || 
|-id=851 bgcolor=#d6d6d6
| 201851 ||  || — || December 19, 2003 || Socorro || LINEAR || — || align=right | 3.6 km || 
|-id=852 bgcolor=#d6d6d6
| 201852 ||  || — || December 19, 2003 || Socorro || LINEAR || — || align=right | 8.3 km || 
|-id=853 bgcolor=#d6d6d6
| 201853 ||  || — || December 22, 2003 || Socorro || LINEAR || — || align=right | 5.8 km || 
|-id=854 bgcolor=#d6d6d6
| 201854 ||  || — || December 22, 2003 || Catalina || CSS || — || align=right | 5.1 km || 
|-id=855 bgcolor=#d6d6d6
| 201855 ||  || — || December 27, 2003 || Socorro || LINEAR || THM || align=right | 4.8 km || 
|-id=856 bgcolor=#fefefe
| 201856 ||  || — || December 28, 2003 || Socorro || LINEAR || H || align=right | 1.0 km || 
|-id=857 bgcolor=#d6d6d6
| 201857 ||  || — || December 27, 2003 || Socorro || LINEAR || — || align=right | 5.9 km || 
|-id=858 bgcolor=#d6d6d6
| 201858 ||  || — || December 27, 2003 || Socorro || LINEAR || — || align=right | 7.2 km || 
|-id=859 bgcolor=#E9E9E9
| 201859 ||  || — || December 28, 2003 || Socorro || LINEAR || INO || align=right | 1.9 km || 
|-id=860 bgcolor=#d6d6d6
| 201860 ||  || — || December 28, 2003 || Socorro || LINEAR || CRO || align=right | 6.0 km || 
|-id=861 bgcolor=#d6d6d6
| 201861 ||  || — || December 28, 2003 || Socorro || LINEAR || VER || align=right | 5.6 km || 
|-id=862 bgcolor=#d6d6d6
| 201862 ||  || — || December 28, 2003 || Socorro || LINEAR || URS || align=right | 5.9 km || 
|-id=863 bgcolor=#d6d6d6
| 201863 ||  || — || December 28, 2003 || Socorro || LINEAR || — || align=right | 4.1 km || 
|-id=864 bgcolor=#d6d6d6
| 201864 ||  || — || December 28, 2003 || Socorro || LINEAR || — || align=right | 3.3 km || 
|-id=865 bgcolor=#d6d6d6
| 201865 ||  || — || December 28, 2003 || Socorro || LINEAR || — || align=right | 5.1 km || 
|-id=866 bgcolor=#d6d6d6
| 201866 ||  || — || December 28, 2003 || Socorro || LINEAR || — || align=right | 3.4 km || 
|-id=867 bgcolor=#d6d6d6
| 201867 ||  || — || December 28, 2003 || Socorro || LINEAR || — || align=right | 3.6 km || 
|-id=868 bgcolor=#d6d6d6
| 201868 ||  || — || December 29, 2003 || Catalina || CSS || — || align=right | 5.3 km || 
|-id=869 bgcolor=#d6d6d6
| 201869 ||  || — || December 29, 2003 || Catalina || CSS || — || align=right | 6.4 km || 
|-id=870 bgcolor=#d6d6d6
| 201870 ||  || — || December 29, 2003 || Socorro || LINEAR || — || align=right | 2.9 km || 
|-id=871 bgcolor=#d6d6d6
| 201871 ||  || — || December 29, 2003 || Socorro || LINEAR || — || align=right | 3.2 km || 
|-id=872 bgcolor=#d6d6d6
| 201872 ||  || — || December 17, 2003 || Kitt Peak || Spacewatch || TEL || align=right | 2.0 km || 
|-id=873 bgcolor=#d6d6d6
| 201873 ||  || — || December 17, 2003 || Socorro || LINEAR || — || align=right | 3.9 km || 
|-id=874 bgcolor=#d6d6d6
| 201874 ||  || — || December 17, 2003 || Kitt Peak || Spacewatch || EOS || align=right | 3.1 km || 
|-id=875 bgcolor=#d6d6d6
| 201875 ||  || — || December 18, 2003 || Socorro || LINEAR || HYG || align=right | 3.8 km || 
|-id=876 bgcolor=#d6d6d6
| 201876 ||  || — || December 18, 2003 || Kitt Peak || Spacewatch || LIX || align=right | 4.3 km || 
|-id=877 bgcolor=#d6d6d6
| 201877 ||  || — || December 22, 2003 || Palomar || NEAT || — || align=right | 3.9 km || 
|-id=878 bgcolor=#d6d6d6
| 201878 ||  || — || December 17, 2003 || Socorro || LINEAR || TIR || align=right | 2.6 km || 
|-id=879 bgcolor=#d6d6d6
| 201879 ||  || — || January 5, 2004 || Socorro || LINEAR || EUP || align=right | 7.3 km || 
|-id=880 bgcolor=#d6d6d6
| 201880 ||  || — || January 13, 2004 || Anderson Mesa || LONEOS || — || align=right | 4.6 km || 
|-id=881 bgcolor=#d6d6d6
| 201881 ||  || — || January 13, 2004 || Anderson Mesa || LONEOS || — || align=right | 4.7 km || 
|-id=882 bgcolor=#d6d6d6
| 201882 ||  || — || January 13, 2004 || Palomar || NEAT || — || align=right | 5.3 km || 
|-id=883 bgcolor=#d6d6d6
| 201883 ||  || — || January 13, 2004 || Anderson Mesa || LONEOS || — || align=right | 4.7 km || 
|-id=884 bgcolor=#d6d6d6
| 201884 ||  || — || January 15, 2004 || Kitt Peak || Spacewatch || — || align=right | 4.5 km || 
|-id=885 bgcolor=#fefefe
| 201885 ||  || — || January 13, 2004 || Anderson Mesa || LONEOS || H || align=right data-sort-value="0.85" | 850 m || 
|-id=886 bgcolor=#d6d6d6
| 201886 ||  || — || January 13, 2004 || Kitt Peak || Spacewatch || THM || align=right | 2.6 km || 
|-id=887 bgcolor=#d6d6d6
| 201887 ||  || — || January 13, 2004 || Kitt Peak || Spacewatch || — || align=right | 3.4 km || 
|-id=888 bgcolor=#d6d6d6
| 201888 ||  || — || January 16, 2004 || Palomar || NEAT || — || align=right | 4.4 km || 
|-id=889 bgcolor=#d6d6d6
| 201889 ||  || — || January 16, 2004 || Palomar || NEAT || — || align=right | 3.7 km || 
|-id=890 bgcolor=#d6d6d6
| 201890 ||  || — || January 17, 2004 || Palomar || NEAT || HYG || align=right | 4.5 km || 
|-id=891 bgcolor=#d6d6d6
| 201891 ||  || — || January 17, 2004 || Palomar || NEAT || — || align=right | 6.1 km || 
|-id=892 bgcolor=#d6d6d6
| 201892 ||  || — || January 18, 2004 || Palomar || NEAT || MEL || align=right | 5.9 km || 
|-id=893 bgcolor=#d6d6d6
| 201893 ||  || — || January 18, 2004 || Catalina || CSS || — || align=right | 4.5 km || 
|-id=894 bgcolor=#d6d6d6
| 201894 ||  || — || January 18, 2004 || Kitt Peak || Spacewatch || — || align=right | 5.9 km || 
|-id=895 bgcolor=#d6d6d6
| 201895 ||  || — || January 17, 2004 || Palomar || NEAT || EOS || align=right | 5.0 km || 
|-id=896 bgcolor=#E9E9E9
| 201896 ||  || — || January 20, 2004 || Socorro || LINEAR || — || align=right | 3.4 km || 
|-id=897 bgcolor=#d6d6d6
| 201897 ||  || — || January 19, 2004 || Kitt Peak || Spacewatch || — || align=right | 5.5 km || 
|-id=898 bgcolor=#d6d6d6
| 201898 ||  || — || January 19, 2004 || Kitt Peak || Spacewatch || — || align=right | 3.1 km || 
|-id=899 bgcolor=#d6d6d6
| 201899 ||  || — || January 21, 2004 || Socorro || LINEAR || BRA || align=right | 2.6 km || 
|-id=900 bgcolor=#d6d6d6
| 201900 ||  || — || January 23, 2004 || Anderson Mesa || LONEOS || — || align=right | 2.9 km || 
|}

201901–202000 

|-bgcolor=#d6d6d6
| 201901 ||  || — || January 22, 2004 || Socorro || LINEAR || THM || align=right | 3.5 km || 
|-id=902 bgcolor=#fefefe
| 201902 ||  || — || January 22, 2004 || Socorro || LINEAR || — || align=right | 1.1 km || 
|-id=903 bgcolor=#d6d6d6
| 201903 ||  || — || January 27, 2004 || Socorro || LINEAR || EUP || align=right | 7.5 km || 
|-id=904 bgcolor=#fefefe
| 201904 ||  || — || January 29, 2004 || Socorro || LINEAR || H || align=right data-sort-value="0.98" | 980 m || 
|-id=905 bgcolor=#d6d6d6
| 201905 ||  || — || January 23, 2004 || Socorro || LINEAR || — || align=right | 4.5 km || 
|-id=906 bgcolor=#d6d6d6
| 201906 ||  || — || January 24, 2004 || Socorro || LINEAR || HYG || align=right | 4.8 km || 
|-id=907 bgcolor=#d6d6d6
| 201907 ||  || — || January 24, 2004 || Socorro || LINEAR || HYG || align=right | 4.8 km || 
|-id=908 bgcolor=#d6d6d6
| 201908 ||  || — || January 25, 2004 || Haleakala || NEAT || TIR || align=right | 4.2 km || 
|-id=909 bgcolor=#d6d6d6
| 201909 ||  || — || January 28, 2004 || Catalina || CSS || EUP || align=right | 6.6 km || 
|-id=910 bgcolor=#fefefe
| 201910 ||  || — || January 29, 2004 || Catalina || CSS || H || align=right | 1.2 km || 
|-id=911 bgcolor=#d6d6d6
| 201911 ||  || — || January 28, 2004 || Kitt Peak || Spacewatch || EOS || align=right | 3.9 km || 
|-id=912 bgcolor=#d6d6d6
| 201912 ||  || — || January 26, 2004 || Anderson Mesa || LONEOS || — || align=right | 3.7 km || 
|-id=913 bgcolor=#d6d6d6
| 201913 ||  || — || January 26, 2004 || Anderson Mesa || LONEOS || EOS || align=right | 2.8 km || 
|-id=914 bgcolor=#d6d6d6
| 201914 ||  || — || January 30, 2004 || Catalina || CSS || — || align=right | 5.3 km || 
|-id=915 bgcolor=#d6d6d6
| 201915 ||  || — || January 17, 2004 || Palomar || NEAT || HYG || align=right | 4.4 km || 
|-id=916 bgcolor=#d6d6d6
| 201916 ||  || — || January 19, 2004 || Kitt Peak || Spacewatch || — || align=right | 2.6 km || 
|-id=917 bgcolor=#d6d6d6
| 201917 ||  || — || January 16, 2004 || Kitt Peak || Spacewatch || HYG || align=right | 3.3 km || 
|-id=918 bgcolor=#d6d6d6
| 201918 ||  || — || February 10, 2004 || Palomar || NEAT || — || align=right | 4.8 km || 
|-id=919 bgcolor=#d6d6d6
| 201919 ||  || — || February 10, 2004 || Catalina || CSS || — || align=right | 5.5 km || 
|-id=920 bgcolor=#d6d6d6
| 201920 ||  || — || February 10, 2004 || Palomar || NEAT || — || align=right | 3.9 km || 
|-id=921 bgcolor=#d6d6d6
| 201921 ||  || — || February 15, 2004 || Socorro || LINEAR || — || align=right | 3.2 km || 
|-id=922 bgcolor=#d6d6d6
| 201922 ||  || — || February 11, 2004 || Palomar || NEAT || — || align=right | 3.8 km || 
|-id=923 bgcolor=#d6d6d6
| 201923 ||  || — || February 15, 2004 || Socorro || LINEAR || — || align=right | 6.8 km || 
|-id=924 bgcolor=#d6d6d6
| 201924 ||  || — || February 11, 2004 || Palomar || NEAT || THM || align=right | 5.4 km || 
|-id=925 bgcolor=#d6d6d6
| 201925 ||  || — || February 12, 2004 || Kitt Peak || Spacewatch || — || align=right | 5.2 km || 
|-id=926 bgcolor=#d6d6d6
| 201926 ||  || — || February 12, 2004 || Palomar || NEAT || — || align=right | 4.3 km || 
|-id=927 bgcolor=#d6d6d6
| 201927 ||  || — || February 13, 2004 || Palomar || NEAT || 7:4 || align=right | 6.5 km || 
|-id=928 bgcolor=#d6d6d6
| 201928 ||  || — || February 13, 2004 || Palomar || NEAT || — || align=right | 4.8 km || 
|-id=929 bgcolor=#d6d6d6
| 201929 ||  || — || February 12, 2004 || Kitt Peak || Spacewatch || — || align=right | 4.4 km || 
|-id=930 bgcolor=#d6d6d6
| 201930 ||  || — || February 17, 2004 || Socorro || LINEAR || — || align=right | 4.8 km || 
|-id=931 bgcolor=#fefefe
| 201931 ||  || — || February 20, 2004 || Socorro || LINEAR || H || align=right data-sort-value="0.82" | 820 m || 
|-id=932 bgcolor=#d6d6d6
| 201932 ||  || — || February 17, 2004 || Kitt Peak || Spacewatch || — || align=right | 3.8 km || 
|-id=933 bgcolor=#d6d6d6
| 201933 ||  || — || February 26, 2004 || Desert Eagle || W. K. Y. Yeung || LIX || align=right | 5.9 km || 
|-id=934 bgcolor=#d6d6d6
| 201934 ||  || — || February 23, 2004 || Socorro || LINEAR || — || align=right | 3.0 km || 
|-id=935 bgcolor=#d6d6d6
| 201935 ||  || — || February 26, 2004 || Kitt Peak || M. W. Buie || EOS || align=right | 3.3 km || 
|-id=936 bgcolor=#d6d6d6
| 201936 ||  || — || March 11, 2004 || Palomar || NEAT || EOS || align=right | 3.9 km || 
|-id=937 bgcolor=#d6d6d6
| 201937 ||  || — || March 12, 2004 || Palomar || NEAT || HIL3:2 || align=right | 8.4 km || 
|-id=938 bgcolor=#fefefe
| 201938 ||  || — || March 9, 2004 || Catalina || CSS || H || align=right | 1.5 km || 
|-id=939 bgcolor=#d6d6d6
| 201939 ||  || — || March 15, 2004 || Kitt Peak || Spacewatch || — || align=right | 3.9 km || 
|-id=940 bgcolor=#d6d6d6
| 201940 ||  || — || March 15, 2004 || Palomar || NEAT || — || align=right | 4.0 km || 
|-id=941 bgcolor=#d6d6d6
| 201941 ||  || — || March 15, 2004 || Socorro || LINEAR || — || align=right | 3.5 km || 
|-id=942 bgcolor=#fefefe
| 201942 ||  || — || March 17, 2004 || Catalina || CSS || H || align=right data-sort-value="0.63" | 630 m || 
|-id=943 bgcolor=#fefefe
| 201943 ||  || — || April 15, 2004 || Socorro || LINEAR || — || align=right | 1.1 km || 
|-id=944 bgcolor=#fefefe
| 201944 ||  || — || April 13, 2004 || Palomar || NEAT || — || align=right | 1.1 km || 
|-id=945 bgcolor=#E9E9E9
| 201945 ||  || — || April 15, 2004 || Desert Eagle || W. K. Y. Yeung || — || align=right | 1.7 km || 
|-id=946 bgcolor=#fefefe
| 201946 ||  || — || April 14, 2004 || Catalina || CSS || H || align=right | 1.3 km || 
|-id=947 bgcolor=#fefefe
| 201947 ||  || — || April 19, 2004 || Kitt Peak || Spacewatch || — || align=right data-sort-value="0.83" | 830 m || 
|-id=948 bgcolor=#E9E9E9
| 201948 ||  || — || April 24, 2004 || Kitt Peak || Spacewatch || AST || align=right | 1.8 km || 
|-id=949 bgcolor=#fefefe
| 201949 ||  || — || May 9, 2004 || Haleakala || NEAT || H || align=right data-sort-value="0.99" | 990 m || 
|-id=950 bgcolor=#fefefe
| 201950 ||  || — || May 12, 2004 || Socorro || LINEAR || H || align=right data-sort-value="0.87" | 870 m || 
|-id=951 bgcolor=#fefefe
| 201951 ||  || — || May 15, 2004 || Socorro || LINEAR || — || align=right data-sort-value="0.93" | 930 m || 
|-id=952 bgcolor=#fefefe
| 201952 ||  || — || May 12, 2004 || Anderson Mesa || LONEOS || — || align=right data-sort-value="0.89" | 890 m || 
|-id=953 bgcolor=#fefefe
| 201953 ||  || — || May 13, 2004 || Kitt Peak || Spacewatch || — || align=right | 1.0 km || 
|-id=954 bgcolor=#fefefe
| 201954 ||  || — || May 16, 2004 || Socorro || LINEAR || — || align=right | 1.1 km || 
|-id=955 bgcolor=#fefefe
| 201955 ||  || — || June 11, 2004 || Campo Imperatore || CINEOS || V || align=right data-sort-value="0.97" | 970 m || 
|-id=956 bgcolor=#fefefe
| 201956 ||  || — || June 13, 2004 || Catalina || CSS || — || align=right | 1.4 km || 
|-id=957 bgcolor=#fefefe
| 201957 ||  || — || June 24, 2004 || Campo Imperatore || CINEOS || — || align=right | 1.0 km || 
|-id=958 bgcolor=#fefefe
| 201958 ||  || — || July 11, 2004 || Palomar || NEAT || V || align=right | 1.2 km || 
|-id=959 bgcolor=#fefefe
| 201959 ||  || — || July 11, 2004 || Socorro || LINEAR || — || align=right | 1.3 km || 
|-id=960 bgcolor=#fefefe
| 201960 ||  || — || July 11, 2004 || Socorro || LINEAR || NYS || align=right data-sort-value="0.76" | 760 m || 
|-id=961 bgcolor=#fefefe
| 201961 ||  || — || July 11, 2004 || Socorro || LINEAR || — || align=right | 1.3 km || 
|-id=962 bgcolor=#fefefe
| 201962 ||  || — || July 14, 2004 || Socorro || LINEAR || V || align=right data-sort-value="0.78" | 780 m || 
|-id=963 bgcolor=#fefefe
| 201963 ||  || — || July 15, 2004 || Socorro || LINEAR || V || align=right | 1.1 km || 
|-id=964 bgcolor=#fefefe
| 201964 ||  || — || July 11, 2004 || Socorro || LINEAR || ERI || align=right | 2.3 km || 
|-id=965 bgcolor=#fefefe
| 201965 ||  || — || July 16, 2004 || Socorro || LINEAR || — || align=right | 1.3 km || 
|-id=966 bgcolor=#fefefe
| 201966 ||  || — || July 25, 2004 || Anderson Mesa || LONEOS || — || align=right | 1.5 km || 
|-id=967 bgcolor=#fefefe
| 201967 ||  || — || August 7, 2004 || Palomar || NEAT || NYS || align=right data-sort-value="0.83" | 830 m || 
|-id=968 bgcolor=#fefefe
| 201968 ||  || — || August 8, 2004 || Campo Imperatore || CINEOS || NYS || align=right data-sort-value="0.97" | 970 m || 
|-id=969 bgcolor=#fefefe
| 201969 ||  || — || August 8, 2004 || Anderson Mesa || LONEOS || — || align=right | 1.1 km || 
|-id=970 bgcolor=#fefefe
| 201970 ||  || — || August 8, 2004 || Anderson Mesa || LONEOS || NYS || align=right data-sort-value="0.84" | 840 m || 
|-id=971 bgcolor=#fefefe
| 201971 ||  || — || August 8, 2004 || Anderson Mesa || LONEOS || — || align=right | 1.1 km || 
|-id=972 bgcolor=#fefefe
| 201972 ||  || — || August 8, 2004 || Socorro || LINEAR || NYS || align=right data-sort-value="0.84" | 840 m || 
|-id=973 bgcolor=#fefefe
| 201973 ||  || — || August 6, 2004 || Palomar || NEAT || NYS || align=right data-sort-value="0.90" | 900 m || 
|-id=974 bgcolor=#fefefe
| 201974 ||  || — || August 7, 2004 || Palomar || NEAT || — || align=right data-sort-value="0.88" | 880 m || 
|-id=975 bgcolor=#fefefe
| 201975 ||  || — || August 8, 2004 || Socorro || LINEAR || — || align=right | 1.3 km || 
|-id=976 bgcolor=#fefefe
| 201976 ||  || — || August 8, 2004 || Socorro || LINEAR || MAS || align=right data-sort-value="0.86" | 860 m || 
|-id=977 bgcolor=#fefefe
| 201977 ||  || — || August 8, 2004 || Anderson Mesa || LONEOS || NYS || align=right | 1.0 km || 
|-id=978 bgcolor=#fefefe
| 201978 ||  || — || August 8, 2004 || Anderson Mesa || LONEOS || NYS || align=right | 2.1 km || 
|-id=979 bgcolor=#fefefe
| 201979 ||  || — || August 8, 2004 || Socorro || LINEAR || NYS || align=right data-sort-value="0.88" | 880 m || 
|-id=980 bgcolor=#fefefe
| 201980 ||  || — || August 8, 2004 || Socorro || LINEAR || — || align=right | 1.0 km || 
|-id=981 bgcolor=#fefefe
| 201981 ||  || — || August 8, 2004 || Socorro || LINEAR || NYS || align=right | 1.1 km || 
|-id=982 bgcolor=#fefefe
| 201982 ||  || — || August 8, 2004 || Socorro || LINEAR || — || align=right | 1.5 km || 
|-id=983 bgcolor=#fefefe
| 201983 ||  || — || August 8, 2004 || Socorro || LINEAR || NYS || align=right data-sort-value="0.87" | 870 m || 
|-id=984 bgcolor=#fefefe
| 201984 ||  || — || August 8, 2004 || Socorro || LINEAR || — || align=right | 1.1 km || 
|-id=985 bgcolor=#fefefe
| 201985 ||  || — || August 8, 2004 || Anderson Mesa || LONEOS || NYS || align=right | 1.1 km || 
|-id=986 bgcolor=#fefefe
| 201986 ||  || — || August 9, 2004 || Socorro || LINEAR || — || align=right | 1.1 km || 
|-id=987 bgcolor=#fefefe
| 201987 ||  || — || August 8, 2004 || Socorro || LINEAR || NYS || align=right data-sort-value="0.84" | 840 m || 
|-id=988 bgcolor=#fefefe
| 201988 ||  || — || August 8, 2004 || Socorro || LINEAR || MAS || align=right data-sort-value="0.82" | 820 m || 
|-id=989 bgcolor=#fefefe
| 201989 ||  || — || August 8, 2004 || Anderson Mesa || LONEOS || MAS || align=right data-sort-value="0.77" | 770 m || 
|-id=990 bgcolor=#E9E9E9
| 201990 ||  || — || August 9, 2004 || Socorro || LINEAR || — || align=right | 1.4 km || 
|-id=991 bgcolor=#fefefe
| 201991 ||  || — || August 10, 2004 || Socorro || LINEAR || FLO || align=right | 1.0 km || 
|-id=992 bgcolor=#fefefe
| 201992 ||  || — || August 10, 2004 || Socorro || LINEAR || NYS || align=right | 1.0 km || 
|-id=993 bgcolor=#fefefe
| 201993 ||  || — || August 10, 2004 || Socorro || LINEAR || — || align=right | 1.6 km || 
|-id=994 bgcolor=#fefefe
| 201994 ||  || — || August 10, 2004 || Socorro || LINEAR || NYS || align=right | 1.2 km || 
|-id=995 bgcolor=#E9E9E9
| 201995 ||  || — || August 11, 2004 || Socorro || LINEAR || — || align=right | 1.3 km || 
|-id=996 bgcolor=#fefefe
| 201996 ||  || — || August 10, 2004 || Socorro || LINEAR || — || align=right | 1.4 km || 
|-id=997 bgcolor=#fefefe
| 201997 ||  || — || August 14, 2004 || Palomar || NEAT || ERI || align=right | 3.5 km || 
|-id=998 bgcolor=#fefefe
| 201998 ||  || — || August 12, 2004 || Socorro || LINEAR || ERI || align=right | 2.2 km || 
|-id=999 bgcolor=#fefefe
| 201999 ||  || — || August 12, 2004 || Socorro || LINEAR || — || align=right | 1.4 km || 
|-id=000 bgcolor=#fefefe
| 202000 ||  || — || August 11, 2004 || Socorro || LINEAR || NYS || align=right data-sort-value="0.87" | 870 m || 
|}

References

External links 
 Discovery Circumstances: Numbered Minor Planets (200001)–(205000) (IAU Minor Planet Center)

0201